= Gerhard Ritter =

German historian (1888–1967)

Gerhard Georg Bernhard Ritter (6 April 1888 – 1 July 1967) was a German historian who served as a professor of history at the University of Freiburg from 1925 to 1956. He studied under Professor Hermann Oncken. A Lutheran, he first became well known for his 1925 biography of Martin Luther and hagiographic portrayal of Prussia. A member of the German People's Party during the Weimar Republic, he was a lifelong monarchist and remained sympathetic to the political system of the defunct German Empire.

A critic of both democracy and totalitarianism, he supported authoritarian rule and German supremacy in Europe. His vision of history was narrowed to German interests, had little sympathy for foreign nations, and was full of disdain for Catholicism. Eventually, his conflict with the Nazi regime got him arrested by it in 1944.

After World War II, Ritter worked to restore German nationalism by attempting to separate it from Nazi ideology and favored pursuit of German national interests, rather than reconciliation with the victims of German aggression. At the end of his career, he argued against theories of the German historian Fritz Fischer. Ritter became an honorary member of the American Historical Association in 1959.

== Early life ==
Ritter was born in Bad Sooden-Allendorf (now in the federal state of Hesse, in Central Germany). His father was a Lutheran clergyman. The young Ritter was educated at a gymnasium in Gütersloh.

== University studies ==
His studies were continued at the Ludwig-Maximilians-Universität München, Heidelberg University, and Leipzig University. Ritter began serving as a teacher in 1912. While studying at Heidelberg University, he was a research assistant to the national-liberal historian Hermann Oncken, who was a major influence on Ritter. Professor Oncken opposed the Nazis and was forced to resign in 1935.

Ritter's first book was published in 1913: Die preußischen Konservativen und Bismarcks deutsche Politik (The Prussian Conservatives and Bismarck's German Policy). It was his PhD dissertation completed in 1911 under the supervision of Oncken. Ritter examined the dispute between Otto von Bismarck and conservative Prussian Junkers from 1858 to 1876. The Junkers felt that Bismarck's policy was a menace to their traditional privileges. A source of special conflict between Bismarck and the Junkers was their opposition to Bismarck's compromises with the southern German states, which were seen as a threat to the traditional powers that they enjoyed. The theme of the extent of one's allegiance to those who hold power would be a recurring subject in Ritter's works.

== First World War ==
Ritter fought as an infantryman in the First World War. Ritter was strongly committed to a German victory. He criticised the ideology of Pan-German League as chauvinistic nationalism, but he found it difficult to come to terms with the German defeat.

He regarded the German defeat of 1918 as a great disaster. Ritter believed that the monarchy had been the best form of government for Germany and that the Weimar Republic was a grave mistake since Germany did not have a tradition of republicanism. Ritter subscribed to the 19th-century view of history as a form of political education for the elite, and contemporary politics were always a pressing concern for him.

== Marriage and family ==
In 1919, he married Gertrud Reichardt with whom he had three children.

== Weimar Republic ==
Ritter worked as a professor at Heidelberg University (1918–1923), the University of Hamburg (1923–1925), and the University of Freiburg (1925–1956). During his time at Heidelberg University, he began an official history of the university from the Middle Ages to the present, but only one volume was ever published.

=== Biography of Luther ===
In 1925, Ritter published a sympathetic biography of Martin Luther that made his reputation as a historian. Ritter treated his subject as an excellent example of the "eternal German". Ritter argued against the view of Luther as an opportunist, which was promoted by Ernst Troeltsch and Max Weber, and instead contended that Luther was a man of faith, who possessed the ability to expose what Ritter regarded as grave flaws in the Catholic Church. Ritter argued that Luther had inspired his followers to have the self-confidence to improve the world.

Ritter's Luther biography was written in large part under the impact of the defeat of 1918 and so Ritter went to great lengths to defend what he regarded as the unique German spirit against what Ritter saw as the corrupt materialist spiritual outlook of the West. Throughout his life, Lutheranism was a major influence on Ritter's writings.

In particular, Ritter agreed with Luther's argument that the moral values of Christianity were relevant to only the individual, not the state. Citing Luther, Ritter argued that the state had to hold power and that as part of the messy business of politics, it could be guided only by the Christian values of its leaders. Taking up of the ideas of Rudolf Kjellén and Friedrich Patzel, Ritter argued that the state should be regarded as a living entity, which, to live successfully, required economic and territorial growth. Using that argument, Ritter contended that Frederick the Great's invasion of Silesia in 1740 was a necessary act to allow the Prussian state to live regardless of international laws against aggression.

=== Stein biography ===
During the last years of the Weimar Republic, Ritter changed his focus from the medieval period to the early modern period to the modern period and from cultural history to biographies of political figures. In 1931, Ritter wrote the biography of the Prussian statesmen Karl vom Stein. Ritter's two-volume work portrayed Stein as the total opposite of Bismarck. Ritter argued that Bismarck was the ultimate power politician and that Stein was the ultimate anti-power politician. Ritter argued that Stein's success as a politician was limited by his moralism but contended that despite his lack of political sense, he was nonetheless successful because of his strong moral character.

=== Views on eve of Nazi takeover ===
On 11 February 1933, in a letter to a friend, Ritter described his intentions:

I am planning to write two books. One will be entitled 'What is Liberalism?', and will be the attempt to pave the way for the founding of a large national party of the center, a party which we need today more than ever before. The book will contribute to the drafting of a new liberal national program, which will offer political orientation based on historical reflection.... The second book is to...shed light on the great crises in the political and intellectual history of Germany, and will thus explain the present state of mind of the German people. This second book will serve two purposes. It will develop a new concept of the history of our nation... and it will help deepen the notion of the idea of German nationality and national consciousness after a time which this idea has in public use become unbearably trivial. New tasks are crowding in upon us. In our era the historian acquires a distinctive national function, an educational function. Certainly, for the time being no one wants to listen to him, because everyone is still running after noisy political agitators. But I am confident that a time will come when everyone will be thoroughly fed up with the din of national phrase-making and will long for a pure drink instead of the inebriating potion administered by the Nazis. The historian has to prepare positions for the reserves...".

Already, at mid-day on January 30, 1933, in a fateful step, German President Paul von Hindenburg had confirmed the leader of the Nazi Party as the new German chancellor, who would lead, for a time, a minority government.

== Nazi regime ==
=== Initial support ===
Initially, Ritter supported the Nazi regime despite severe doubts about the Nazis, particularly over the regime's persecution of the churches. He reconciled himself to refraining from censure of the regime and its foreign policy. In 1940, he stated that "the sword is always more ready to the hand of continental statesman who stands in the midst of the fray of European power interests, and must always be armed to counter an attack before it is too late". He agreed with Benito Mussolini that "might is the precondition of all freedom".

Ritter publicly referred to the Nazi Reich as the "peaceful center of Europe" that would form a "bulwark against Bolshevism", and he praised the German Anschluss (union) with Austria. Having supported well before 1933 the idea of Greater Germany, Ritter at first defended the Nazi invasion as a realisation of the German hopes like most other people. He went on record praising the Anschluss as the "boldest and most felicitous foreign policy feat of our new government".

=== National conservative ===
Ritter was a staunch German nationalist and belonged to a political movement generally known to historians as national conservatism. He identified with the idea of an authoritarian government in Germany that would make his country Europe's foremost power. In an article published in early 1933, "Eternal Right and Interests of the State", he argued that the German people needed most was a government "in which a strong authoritarian leadership will gain voluntary popular allegiance because it is willing to respect eternal justice as well as freedom".

The deep belief that Ritter had in a Rechtsstaat (a state upheld by law) made him increasingly concerned at Nazi violations of legal codes. In 1935, while remaining very cautious about his public comments on Nazism generally, he attempted to defend his mentor, Oncken, against attacks by Nazis. The party officials had objected to a paper by Oncken, which implied that the Nazi revolution was not the greatest revolution of all time.

=== Frederick the Great biography ===
Ritter's 1936 short interpretive biography of Frederick the Great has been described by the American military historian Peter Paret as one of the finest military biographies ever written.

The historian Russell Weigley called it "the best introduction to Frederick the Great and indeed to European warfare in his time". James J. Sheehan says it is the best book in English on the famous king.

Ritter's biography was designed as a challenge to Nazi ideology, which claimed a continuity between Frederick and Hitler. Dorpalen wrote: "The book was indeed a very courageous indictment of Hitler's irrationalism and recklessness, his ideological fanaticism and insatiable lust for power". Dorpalen, nevertheless, criticised Ritter's historiography as apologetic of Prussian militarism, German past and figures like Frederick the Great and Bismarck.

Ritter's emphasis on Frederick's limited war aims and willingness to settle for less than he initially sought was seen at the time as a form of oblique criticism of Adolf Hitler. In addition, the emphasis that Ritter placed on the influence of the Enlightenment and "orderly reason" on Fredrick were intended by Ritter to disprove Hitler's claim quietly of being Frederick's successor. The inspiration behind the Fredrick biography was Ritter's personal reaction to the Day of Potsdam, 22 March 1933, on which Hitler had laid claim to the Prussian traditions in a way that Ritter felt was not historically accurate.

In March 1936, upon witnessing the remilitarization of the Rhineland, Ritter wrote in a letter to his mother that for his children "who had never seen German soldiers from close up, this is one of the greatest experiences ever.... Truly a great and magnificent experience. May God grant that it does not lead to some international catastrophe".

=== Acts against regime ===
Ritter was a devout Lutheran and became a member of the Confessing Church, a group of dissenting Lutherans that resisted the Nazi-inspired and Nazi-imposed "Aryan Christianity" during the 1930s.

In 1938, Ritter was the only faculty member at Freiburg to attend the funeral of Edmund Husserl, who was considered the founder of the modern philosophical school of phenomenology. Husserl had been on the faculty at the University of Freiburg until the Nazis in 1933 caused him to be dismissed because of his Jewish origins. Husserl was then also prevented from publishing his works.

Ritter's presence at the funeral of Husserl has been widely interpreted ever since as an act of quiet courage and political protest against the Nazi regime. After the Kristallnacht pogrom, Ritter wrote in a letter to his mother, "What we have experienced over the last two weeks all over the country is the most shameful and most dreadful thing that has happened for a long time".

In 1938, Ritter delivered a series of lectures in Jena attacking Friedrich Nietzsche. The lectures were intended by Ritter to be a form of indirect protest of the Nazi regime.

=== 1938 historicism debate with Meinecke ===
In 1938, Ritter became involved in a major debate with Friedrich Meinecke over "historism". Meinecke argued in favor of the idea of celebrating the "valuable individual quality" of all the phenomena of history, which was judged not by universal standards but only in regard to their own values. Ritter attacked that position by arguing that, without universal notions of values of good and evil, judging all historical phenomena by their own standards was to abandon all ideas of morality applicable to all times and places.

=== Freiburger Kreis ===
After the 1938 Kristallnacht pogrom, Ritter became a founding member of the Freiburger Kreis, a discussion group whose focus was neoliberal policy for the political economy. It was composed of anti-Nazi professors which included Adolf Lampe, Constantin von Dietze, Franz Böhm and Walter Eucken.

=== Advisor to Goerdeler ===
Later, Ritter worked as an advisor to the German conservative politician Carl Goerdeler. Together, they considered a future constitution after the overthrow of the Nazis. Both were involved in the secret plans to take down Hitler (see below).

In a Denkschrift submitted to Goerdeler in January 1943, Ritter wrote, "Hundreds of thousands of human beings have been systematically murdered solely because of their Jewish ancestry". Although urging that the Holocaust should be immediately ended, Ritter went on in the same memo to suggest that in a future post-Nazi government, the modern civil rights of Jews should be restricted.

=== Book on Machiavelli and utopia ===
In 1940, Ritter published Machtstaat und Utopie (National Power and Utopia). In this book, Ritter argued that democracy was a luxury that only militarily-secure states could afford. Ritter argued that because Britain is an island, that provides a degree of security that allows democracy. By contrast, Ritter argued that Germany, with its location in Central Europe needed an authoritarian government as the only way of maintaining security.

Ritter also contrasted the utopianism of Sir Thomas More and the realism of Niccolò Machiavelli. Ritter declares that Germany had to follow the realism of Machiavelli because of the security requirements of its geographic position. Ritter describes two sorts of values as generated by two different types of polities: one traditionally Anglo-Saxon and the other continental, as personified by the contrast of More and Machiavelli.

Ritter praised Machiavelli as the ideal thinker who understood the "paradox of power", state power to be effective always involving the use of or the threat of violence. Accordingly, society could not function without an armed police power to hold it together and a military against foreign threats. Ritter criticised More for refusing to acknowledge the paradox of power. Instead, More seemed to think that morality could function in politics without the threat of and/or use of violence.

Ritter presented traditional Anglo-Saxon thinking about power, which depend on an ineffective legalism, as inferior to continental thinking, which is based on an understanding of the ultimate necessity of some form of violence. The historian Gregory Weeks commented that it is hard to tell how much of Machstaat und Utopie was material that was inserted to allow the book to be passed by the censors and how much was the expression of Ritter's own beliefs. Weeks argued that if Ritter was no Nazi, he was certainly a German nationalist who wished to see Germany as the world's great power.

Ritter appeared to disavow part of his original work of 1940 by the addition of a footnote to the third edition of Machstaat und Utopie that was published in 1943. Ritter praised More for his understanding of "the demoniacal forces of power" against which More had appealed to the strength of Christian morality and so More rightly did not reduce all politics to a "friend–foe" mentality. The historian Klaus Schwabe observed that Ritter's disapproval of the term "friend–foe" was a not-so-veiled criticism of Carl Schmitt, who had popularised the term a decade before and supported the Nazi regime. Thus, Ritter's criticism indirectly pointed at such Nazi "forces of power".

=== Censored book on military ===
During World War II, Ritter became involved in work on a study of civilian–military relations in Germany from the 18th century to the 20th century. The original intent behind this work was to offer a critique of the "total war" philosophy of General Ludendorff as a form of indirect protest against Nazi Germany. Censorship prevented the book from being published during the war, and after 1945, Ritter revised his work to publish it as a four-volume study of German militarism.

=== Assassination plot ===
Ritter was involved in the 20 July 1944 Stauffenberg assassination plot and was one of the few conspirators not murdered by the Nazis. His friend and political associate, Carl Goerdeler, was slated to become the new chancellor under a post-Nazi regime. If the coup had succeeded, the plotters planned to bargain with the Western Allies for Germany to keep territories in Eastern Europe, which were being invaded by the Soviet Union. Goerdeler was executed by the Nazis in 1945.

Ritter, who also belonged to the conservative German opposition to the Nazis, was imprisoned in late 1944 for the rest of the war.

== Themes after World War II ==
=== Source of Nazi evils ===
Two major themes of Ritter's writings after 1945 were attempts to prove that the Bismarckian tradition in German life had nothing to do with national socialism and that it was democracy of the masses, rather than aristocratic conservatism, that had caused the Nazi movement. After World War II, Ritter wrote the book Europa und die deutsche Frage (Europe and the German Question), which denied that Nazi Germany was the inevitable product of German history but considered that it was rather in Ritter's view part of a general European drift towards totalitarianism that had been going on since the French Revolution; as such, Germans should not be singled out for criticism.

In Ritter's opinion, the origins of National Socialism went back to Jean-Jacques Rousseau's concept of the volonté générale (general will) and the Jacobins. Ritter argued, "National Socialism is not an originally German growth, but the German form of a European phenomenon: the one-party or Führer state", which was the result of "modern industrial society with its uniform mass humanity".

Along the same lines, Ritter wrote that "not any event in German history, but the great French Revolution undermined the firm foundation of Europe's political traditions. It also coined the new concepts and slogans with whose help the modern state of the Volk and the Führer justifies its existence". Ritter argued that throughout the 19th century, there had been worrisome signs in Germany and the rest of Europe caused by the entry of masses into politics but that it was World War I that marked the decisive turning point.

According to Ritter, World War I had caused a general collapse in moral values throughout the West, and it was that moral degeneration that led to the decline of Christianity, the rise of materialism, political corruption, the eclipse of civilization by barbarism and demagogic politics, which, in turn, led to National Socialism. In Ritter's view, the problem with the Weimar Republic was not that it lacked democracy but that it had too much democracy. He argued that the democratic republic had left the German state open to being hijacked by the appeals of rabble-rousing extremists. In Ritter's view, if his much beloved German Empire had continued after 1918, there would have been no Nazi Germany.

Ritter argued that democracy was the essential precondition of totalitarianism because it created the window of opportunity for a strongman to make himself the personification of the "popular will". That led Ritter to conclude that "the system of 'totalitarian' dictatorship as such is not a specifically German phenomenon" but that it was the natural result of when "the direct rule of the people derived from the 'revolt of the masses' is introduced". Ritter argued that the precursors of Hitler were "neither Frederick the Great, Bismarck nor Wilhelm II, but the demagogues and Caesars of modern history from Danton to Lenin to Mussolini".

=== Rescue of German nationalism ===
Ritter saw his main task after 1945 of seeking to restore German nationalism against what he regarded as unjust slurs. Ritter argued that Germans needed a positive view of their past but warned against the appeal of "false concepts of honor and national power". He belonged to group of German historians that rejected reconciliation with victims of Nazi aggression but supported Germany pursuing its national interests.

He railed against the fact that the Allies occupational authorities had confiscated German archives at the end of World War II and had begun to publish a critical edition of German foreign policy records without the participation of German historians. He used his official position as the first postwar head of the German Historical Association to demand the return of the records and held the opinion that their absence was hurting his own research projects the most.

In his treatment of the German Resistance, Ritter drew a sharp line between those who worked with foreign powers to defeat Hitler and those like Carl Friedrich Goerdeler who sought to overthrow the Nazis but worked for Germany. For Ritter, Goerdeler was a patriot, but the men and women of the Rote Kapelle spy network were traitors. Ritter wrote that those involved in the Rote Kapelle were not part of the "German Resistance, but stood in the service of the enemy abroad" and so fully deserved to be executed.

Ritter saw his wish to shape the perception of German history somewhat enhanced in 1949 when he was made chairman of the Verband der Historiker und Historikerinnen Deutschlands, newly founding an old organization (originally founded in 1895) that had slipped into meaninglessness during the time of the Third Reich.

=== Ecumenical progression ===
Besides defending German nationalism, Ritter became active in the ecumenical movement after 1945 and urged conservative Catholics and Protestants to come together in the Christian Democratic Union. He argued that based on his experience in Nazi Germany, Christians, regardless of their church, needed to work together against totalitarianism.

During the war, as a result of his underground work, Ritter came to know a number of Catholic and Calvinist members of the German opposition, which caused Ritter to abandon his former prejudices against Catholics and Calvinists. Ritter came to the conclusion that whatever differences divided Lutherans, Catholics and Calvinists, members of all three churches had more in common to unite them against the Nazis.

=== Goerdeler biography ===
In 1954, Ritter published an acclaimed biography of Carl Goerdeler, a close friend, a conservative politician who was executed by the Nazis in 1945. Goerdeler was a devout Lutheran and the son of a conservative Prussian politician. Ritter pushed for the translation of his Goerdeler biography into English to counter the publication of John W. Wheeler-Bennett's book Nemesis of Power, which in his view vilified the German resistance.

=== German militarism ===
Ritter specialized in German political, military and cultural history. Ritter always drew a sharp distinction between what he regarded as the Machtpolitik (power politics) of Bismarck in which military policy was subjected to carefully limited political goals and the endless expansionism that was motivated by militarism and bizarre racial theories of the Nazis.

Ritter was well known for his assertions denying that there was a uniquely-aggressive German version of militarism. For Ritter, militarism was the "one-sided determination of political decisions on the basis of technical military considerations" and foreign expansionism, and it had nothing to do with values of a society.

In a paper presented to the German Historical Convention in 1953, "The Problem of Militarism in Germany", Ritter argued traditional Prussian leaders such as Frederick the Great were Machtpolitiker (power politicians), not militarists, since in Ritter's view, Frederick was opposed to "the ruthless sacrifice of all life to the purposes of war" and instead was interested in creating "a lasting order of laws and peace, to further general welfare, and to moderate the conflict of interests".

Ritter maintained that militarism first appeared during the French Revolution, when the revolutionary French state, later to be followed by Napoleon I's regime, began the total mobilization of society to seek "the total destruction of the enemy". Likewise, Ritter contended that Otto von Bismarck was a Kabinettspolitker (Cabinet politician), not a militarist, and ensured that political considerations were always placed ahead of military considerations. Ritter was to expand on these views in a four-volume study Staatskunst und Kriegshandwerk (translated into English as The Sword and the Scepter), published between 1954 and 1968, in which Ritter examined the development of militarism in Germany between 1890 and 1918.

In Volume 2 of Staatskunst und Kriegshandwerk, Ritter commented that it was only after Bismarck's sacking in 1890 that militarism first appeared in Germany. Accordingly, a review of the first years of the 20th century was "not without a sense of psychological shock". Ritter wrote that "the prewar Germany of my own youth, which has for an entire lifetime been illuminated in my memory by the radiant splendor of a sun that seemed to grow dark only after the outbreak of the war of 1914" was "in the evening of my life" darkened by "shadows that were much deeper than my generation-and certainly the generation of my academic teachers-was able to perceive at the time".

For Ritter, it was the radicalizing experience of the First World War that had finally led to the triumph of militarism in Germany, especially after 1916, when Erich Ludendorff established his "silent dictatorship", which Ritter believed was a huge break with Prussian and German traditions. It was the unhappy results of that war that finally led to the "proletarian nationalism" of the Nazis gaining a mass audience and to the "militarism of the National Socialist mass movement" coming to power. Moreover, Ritter placed great emphasis on the "Hitler factor" as an explanation for Nazi Germany. In 1962, Ritter wrote that he found it "almost unbearable" that the "will of a single madman" had unnecessarily caused World War II.

=== Critical views on German history ===
Though many regarded Ritter's work as an apologia for German nationalism and conservatism, Ritter was at times critical of aspects of the German past. Though Ritter commented that many nations had bent their knees in submission to false values, "the Germans accepted all of that with special ardor when it was now preached to them by National Socialism, and their nationalism had in general displayed from its beginning a particularly intense, combative quality".

At the first meeting of German historians in 1949, Ritter delivered a speech:

"We constantly run the risk not only of being condemned by the world as nationalists, but actually being misused as expert witnesses by all those circles and tendencies that, in their impatient and blind nationalism, have shut their ears to the teachings of the most recent past. Never was our political responsibility greater, not only to Germany, but also to Europe and the world. And yet never has our path been so dangerously narrow between Scylla and Charybdis as today".

In 1953, Ritter found a copy of the "Great Memorandum" relating to German military planning written by General Alfred Graf von Schlieffen in 1905. The following year, Ritter published the "Great Memorandum" and his observations about the Schlieffen Plan as Der Schlieffen-Plan: Kritik Eines Mythos (The Schlieffen Plan: Critique of a Myth).

== Role in Fischer Controversy ==
=== Break or continuity? ===
In his last years, Ritter emerged as the leading critic of the left-wing historian Fritz Fischer, who claimed that there had been powerful lines of continuity between the German Empire and Nazi Germany and that it was Germany that had caused World War I. During the ferocious "Fischer Controversy", which engulfed the West German historical profession in the 1960s, Ritter was the best known of Fischer's critics.

Ritter fiercely rejected Fischer's arguments that Germany had been primarily responsible for the outbreak of war in 1914. The later volumes of Staatskunst und Kriegshandwerk were taken up with the goal of rebutting Fischer's arguments. Ritter claimed that Germany had not started a war of aggression in 1914 but admitted that the situation of the German government had required a foreign policy, which contained the immediate risk of war. Against Fischer's thesis, Ritter maintained that the Chancellor Theobald von Bethmann Hollweg had resisted the demands by General Ludendorff for wide-ranging annexations as a war aim.

=== Ritter's points against Fischer ===
As part of his critique of Fischer, Ritter contended that Germany's principal goal in 1914 was to maintain the Austria-Hungary as a great power; thus, German foreign policy was largely defensive although Fischer claimed that it was mostly aggressive. Ritter claimed that the significance that Fischer attached to the highly-bellicose advice about waging a "preventive war" in the Balkans offered in July 1914 to the Chief of Cabinet of the Austro-Hungarian Foreign Ministry, Count Alexander Hoyos, by the German journalist Viktor Naumann was unwarranted. Ritter charged that Naumann was speaking as a private individual, but Fischer claimed that it was on behalf of the German government.

Likewise, Ritter felt that Fischer had been dishonest in his portrayal of Austro-German relations in July 1914. Ritter charged that Germany had not pressured a reluctant Austria-Hungary into attacking Serbia. Ritter argued, ironically against Fischer, that the main impetus for war within Austria-Hungary came from domestic politics and was internally driven. There were divisions about the best course to pursue in Vienna and Budapest, but it was not German pressure that led Austria-Hungary to choose war as the best option.

In Ritter's opinion, Germany may be criticized for its mistaken evaluation of the state of European power politics in July 1914. According to Ritter, the German government had underrated the state of military readiness in Russia and France, falsely assumed that the British were unwilling to go to war over the violation of Belgian neutrality, overrated the sense of moral outrage caused by the assassination of Archduke Franz Ferdinand on European opinion and above all overestimated the military power and political common sense of Austria-Hungary.

Ritter felt that in retrospect, it was not necessary for Germany to maintain Austria-Hungary as a great power but claimed that at the time, most Germans regarded the Dual Monarchy as a "brother empire" and viewed the prospect of the Balkans being in the Russian sphere of influence as an unacceptable threat. As opposed to Fischer's claim that Germany was deliberately setting off a war of aggression, Ritter argued that Germany's support for Austria-Hungary's retributive plan to invade Serbia was an ad hoc response to the crisis that was gripping Europe.

Ritter accused Fischer of manufacturing the quote he attributed to German General Helmuth von Moltke the Younger, Chief of the General Staff, during a meeting with Austro-Hungarian War Minister Field Marshal Conrad von Hötzendorf, about the necessity of a "speedy attack" on Serbia. Ritter claimed the importance that Fischer attached to the report of the German Army's quartermaster that the army was "ready" for war in 1914 was simply mistaken since the quartermaster always reported every year that the army was "ready" for war.

Likewise, in reference to the order by Chancellor Bethmann Hollweg to Siegfried von Roedern, the State Secretary for Alsace-Lorraine, to end Francophobic remarks in the German-language press in Alsace, Ritter claimed that was proof of Germany's desire not to have a wider war in 1914. He accordingly claimed also that Fischer's contrary interpretation of Bethmann Hollweg's order was not supported by the facts.

Contrary to Fischer's interpretation, Ritter maintained that Bethmann Hollweg's warnings to Vienna were sincerely meant to stop a war, rather than not window dressing intended to distract historical attention from Germany's responsibility for the war. Ritter claimed that Fischer's interpretation of Bethmann Hollweg's meeting with British Ambassador Sir Edward Goschen was mistaken since in Ritter's opinion, if Bethmann Hollweg was serious about securing British neutrality, it made no sense to express the German war aims to Goschen that Fischer attributed to him.

Ritter strongly disagreed with Fischer's interpretation of the meeting of Moltke, Bethmann Hollweg and General Erich von Falkenhayn (the Prussian war minister) on 30 July 1914. Rather than a conscious decision to wage an aggressive war, as Fischer argued, Ritter's claim was that news of Russia's mobilisation led the German generals into persuading a reluctant Bethmann Hollweg to activate the Schlieffen Plan.

Ritter was strongly critical of what he regarded as Fischer's "biased" view of Moltke's reaction to the outbreak of the war and argued that Moltke's opposition to the sudden last-minute suggestion of Wilhelm II for the German attack on France to be cancelled was for logistical concerns, rather than a desire to provoke a world war. Finally, Ritter faults Fischer for his reliance on the memories of Austro-Hungarian leaders such as Count István Tisza and Count Ottokar Czernin, who sought to shift all of the responsibility for the war onto Germany.

Ritter argued there were no lines of continuity between the German Empire and Nazi Germany and considered the Sonderweg view of German history to be a myth. Ritter clearly denied Fischer's arguments that both world wars were "wars for hegemony" by Germany.

In 1964, Ritter successfully lobbied the West German Foreign Ministry to cancel the travel funds that had been allocated for Fischer to visit the United States. In Ritter's opinion, giving Fischer a chance to express his "anti-German" views would be a "national tragedy" and so Fischer should not be allowed to have the government funds for his trip. Writing in 1962, Ritter stated that he felt profound "sadness" over the prospect that Germans may not be as patriotic because of Fischer.

=== Variety of outcomes ===
According to Richard J. Evans, the outcome of the Fischer Controversy and of Ritter's role in it "only succeeded in giving Fischer's massive, scholarly and extremely detailed book a national prominence it would probably not otherwise have achieved". Evans notes that after his death, Ritter was usually cast as the "villain of this affair, as Fischer's views, at least in their more moderate forms, gained widespread acceptance among a younger generation of historians".

A history book on Imperial Germany by Hans-Ulrich Wehler was published in 1973 and held that as a result of Fischer's theories, "two opposing schools of thought" formed. The first agreed with Fischer. The second admitted that Fischer showed that much political talk in high circles that sounds quite warlike, but it held that Fischer failed to find the actual political decisions and military actions that he claimed.

Professor Wolfgang Mommsen (1930-2004) was a German historian of Britain and Germany on the 19th and the 20th centuries. His 1990 work credited Fischer's work in part for opening up the discussion. However, Mommsen characterised Fischer's "central notion of Germany's will to power" from 1911 to 1915 as being seriously flawed, as Fischer "has allowed himself to be carried away". The nature of his methodology worked to obscure his perspective, and Fischer's conclusions displayed a neglect of the historical context. According to Mommsen, Fischer blamed Germany alone for a Social Darwinism that was then European.

Niall Ferguson is a British historian who served as a professor at the University of Oxford and then at Harvard University. In his 1998 work on World War II, The Pity of War, Ferguson reviewed Fischer's claims about German objectives in a European war:

"Yet there is a fundamental flaw in Fischer's reasoning which too many historians have let pass. It is the assumption that Germany's aims as stated after the war had begun were the same as German aims beforehand." Ferguson then recited how a September 1914 program of German aims "is sometimes portrayed as if it were the first open statement of aims which had existed before the outbreak of war.... But the inescapable fact is that no evidence has ever been found by Fischer and his pupils that these objectives existed before Britain's entry into the war.... All that Fischer can produce are the pre-war pipedreams of a few Pan-Germans and businessmen, none of which had any official status, as well as the occasional bellicose utterances of the Kaiser...".

Ferguson also criticised Fischer for seizing on the notion that right-wing officeholders in Germany used an aggressive foreign policy to gain domestic political advantage over the German left. Such misuse of foreign policy, Ferguson noted, "was hardly the invention of the German Right", which in effect repeated the charge made by Mommsen (see above) that Fischer neglected the historical context. In fact, conservative office holders in Germany were articulate and aware that a European war could lead to the ascendancy of the left whether the war was won or lost.

== Honored in America ==
In 1959, Ritter was elected an honorary member of the American Historical Association in recognition of what the Association described as his struggle with totalitarianism. He was the fifth German historian to be so honored by the AHA, one of the last historians of the traditional German idealist school, which considered history as an art. He concerned himself with an imaginative identification with his subjects, focused on the great men of the times studied and was primarily concerned with political and military events.

== Bibliography ==
- Die preußischen Konservativen und Bismarcks deutsche Politik, 1858 bis 1876, 1913.
- Luther: Gestalt und Symbol, 1925.
- Stein: eine politische Biographie, 1931.
- Friedrich der Große, 1936.
- Berthold Ritter zum Gedächtnis, 1946.
- Machstaat und Utopie: vom Streit um die Dämonie der Macht seit Machiavelli und Morus, 1940, revised as Die Dämonie der Macht: Betrachtungen über Geschichte und Wesen des Machtproblems im politischen Denken der Neuzeit, 1947.
- Europa und die Deutsche Frage: Betrachtungen über die geschichtliche Eigenart des Deutschen Staatsdenkens, 1948.
- Die Neugestaltung Deutschlands und Europas im 16. Jahrhundert., 1950.
- Karl Goerdeler und die Deutsche Widerstandsbewegung, 1954.
- Staatskunst und Kriegshandwerk: das Problem des "Militarismus" in Deutschland, 4 volumes, 1954-1968.
  - translated as The Sword and the Scepter: The Problem of Militarism in Germany (4 vol, University of Miami Press 1970-1973); Vol 1, Vol 2, Vol 3 and Vol 4
- Der Schlieffenplan: Kritik eines Mythos, 1956.
- "Eine neue Kriegsschuldthese?" pages 657-668 from Historische Zeitschrift, Volume 194, June 1962, translated into English as "Anti-Fischer: A New War-Guilt Thesis?" pages 135-142 from The Outbreak of World War One: Causes and Responsibilities, edited by Holger Herwig, Boston: Houghton Mifflin C0., 1997.
