= Andreas Freytag =

German economist

- Born: 23 October 1962 (age 63); Kiel, Schleswig-Holstein

Academic background
- Education: University of Cologne; University of Kiel
- Influences: Böhm-Bawerk, Eucken, Tinbergen, Donges, Drazen

Academic work
- Discipline: Political economics
- School or tradition: Freiburg School
- Institutions: University of Jena
- Website: Information at IDEAS / RePEc

Andreas Freytag (born 23 October 1962) is a German economist. He currently holds the chair for political economics at the University of Jena.

Freytag earned his Diplom in economics from the University of Kiel in 1990, where he studied under Herbert Giersch. In 1994, he completed his doctoral degree in economics under supervision of Juergen B. Donges at the University of Cologne.
