= Erdsiek =

Erdsiek is a surname.

== People with the surname ==
- Edith Eucken-Erdsiek (1896–1985), German philosopher and writer
- Ute Erdsiek-Rave (born 1947), German politician

== See also ==
- Ersekë
