= Juergen B. Donges =

German economist (1940–2021)

- Born: 24 October 1940; Seville, Spain
- Died: 25 June 2021 (aged 80)

Academic background
- Education: Saarland University

Academic work
- Discipline: Political economics
- School or tradition: Freiburg School
- Institutions: University of Cologne; University of Kiel

Juergen Bernhard Donges (24 October 1940 – 25 June 2021) was a German economist. He was professor emeritus of political economics at the University of Cologne, and was for a long time member of the German Council of Economic Experts.

Donges earned his Diplom in economics from the Saarland University in Saarbrücken in 1966. In 1969, he received his doctoral degree also from Saarland University. That year he joined faculty at the Kiel Institute for the World Economy, receiving his chair in 1979.

In 1989, Donges moved on to the University of Cologne. Three years later he became a member of the German Council of Economic Experts, and eventually served as the council's chairman from 2000–2002. A proponent of ordoliberal economic policy, Donges was also a member of the Initiative Neue Soziale Marktwirtschaft.
