= Edith Eucken-Erdsiek =

German writer (1896–1985)

- Born: 2 April 1896; Smolensk, Russia
- Died: 22 June 1985 (aged 89); Freiburg im Breisgau

Philosophical work
- School: Freiburg school

Edith Eucken-Erdsiek (born Edith Erdsiek; 2 April 1896 - 22 June 1985) was a German philosopher and writer.

== Biography ==
Erdsiek was born in Smolensk, Russia. Her mother was of Jewish descent, her father was from Westphalia. In 1904, the family moved from Kursk to Germany. They first lived in Düsseldorf, then moved to Berlin in 1905 where she later finished school with the Abitur.

She studied economics, literature and philosophy at the University of Berlin. This is where she met Walter Eucken. The couple got married in December 1920 and Edith gave up her studies. From 1925 to 1927 they lived in Tübingen and then moved to Freiburg. Edith Eucken-Erdsiek published her first essay in 1925 in the magazine Die Tatwelt. Between 1928 and 1934 Edith was editor and publisher of Die Tatwelt. She partly published her works under the pseudonym Janus.

She gave birth to two daughters and a son in the 1930s upon which she gave up her job as publisher and editor. Eucken-Erdsiek joined the Freiburg circles in 1938 and is considered the only women who was part of the Freiburg school.

After World War II, she started working as a publisher and editor again. After her husband's death in 1950, Eucken-Erdsiek worked on publishing his book Grundsätze der Wirtschaftspolitik. She also contributed substantially to the founding of the Walter Eucken Institut in 1954 and was dedicated to maintain personal contact to Walter Eucken's friends and students. The Eucken-Circle met up at their place in Freiburg annually.

Eucken-Erdsiek wrote articles for the Frankfurter Allgemeine Zeitung, the Neue Züricher Zeitung, the Schweizer Monat and the Philosophische Jahrbuch (in German) (English: Yearbook of philosophy).

She was a founding member of the Bund Freiheit der Wissenschaft (in German) (English literally: Union of the Freedom of Science).

Eucken-Erdsiek died in 1985 in Freiburg.

== Publications ==
- Größe und Wahn. Drei Essays über Friedrich den Großen, Napoleon und Hitler. Tübingen 1950
- Unsere Gesellschaftsordnung und die radikale Linke. Stuttgart 1971
- Sie prägten unser Jahrhundert. Zeitgeschichtliche Porträts . Herder, Freiburg im Breisgau 1980, ISBN 3-451-07824-4
- Magie der Extreme – von der Schwierigkeit einer geistigen Orientierung. Herder, Freiburg im Breisgau 1981, ISBN 3-451-07908-9
