= Carl Friedrich Goerdeler =

German politician (1884–1945)

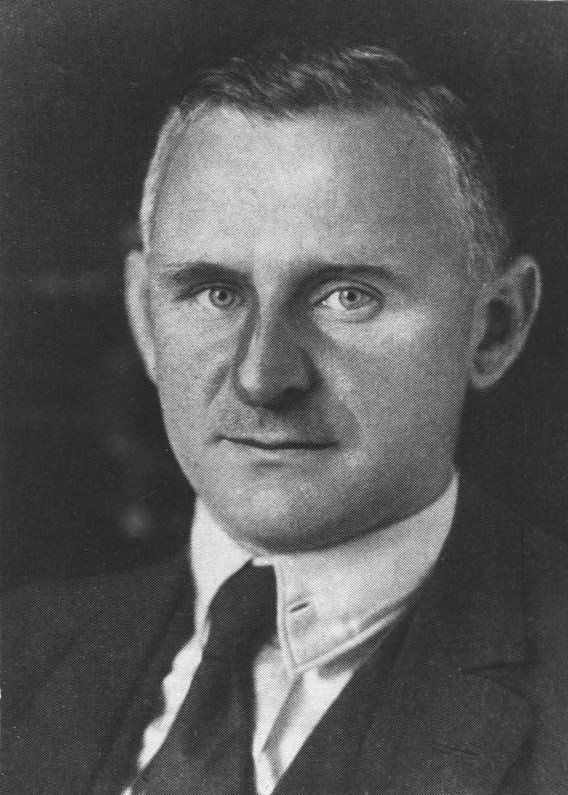
- Goerdeler, c. 1925–1935

Mayor of Leipzig
- In office 22 May 1930 – 31 March 1937
- Preceded by: Karl Wilhelm August Rothe
- Succeeded by: Rudolf Haake

Personal details
- Born: 31 July 1884 Schneidemühl, Posen, Kingdom of Prussia, German Empire (now Piła, Greater Poland, Poland)
- Died: 2 February 1945 (aged 60) Plötzensee Prison, Berlin, Nazi Germany
- Cause of death: Execution by hanging
- Party: DNVP
- Spouse: Anneliese Ulrich (m. 1911)
- Children: 5, including Reinhard
- Occupation: Politician; civil servant; executive; economist
- Known for: One of the leaders of the conservative widerstand movement in Nazi Germany

Carl Friedrich Goerdeler (German: [kaʁl ˈfʁiːdʁɪç ˈɡœʁdəlɐ]; 31 July 1884 – 2 February 1945) was a German conservative politician, monarchist, executive, economist, civil servant and opponent of the Nazi regime. Though he harbored antisemitic beliefs, he opposed anti-Jewish policies while he held office and was opposed to the Holocaust.

Had the 20 July plot to overthrow Hitler's dictatorship in 1944 succeeded, Goerdeler would have served as the Chancellor of the new government. After his arrest, he gave the names of numerous co-conspirators to the Gestapo, causing the arrests and executions of hundreds. Goerdeler was executed by hanging on 2 February 1945.

Due his close relations with the Freiburg Circles, he is regarded as one of many forerunners of the social market economy.

== Early life and career ==
Goerdeler was born into a family of Prussian civil servants in Schneidemühl in the Prussian Province of Posen of the German Empire (now Piła in present-day Poland). Goerdeler's parents supported the Free Conservative Party, and after 1899 Goerdeler's father served in the Prussian Landtag as a member of that party. Goerdeler's biographer and friend Gerhard Ritter described his upbringing as one of a large, loving middle-class family that was cultured, devoutly Lutheran, nationalist and conservative. As a young man, the deeply religious Goerdeler chose as his motto to live by omnia restaurare in Christo (to restore everything in Christ). From 1902 to 1905 Goerdeler studied economics and law at the University of Tübingen. From 1911 he worked as a civil servant for the municipal government of Solingen in the Prussian Rhine Province. The same year, Goerdeler married Anneliese Ulrich, by whom he would have five children.

Goerdeler's own career had been both impressive and idiosyncratic. He came of conservative Prussian stock with a strong sense of duty and service to the State; his father had been a district judge. His upbringing had been happy, but sternly intellectual and moral; his legal training had pointed to a career in local administration and economics ... He was a born organiser, an able, voluble speaker and writer, tough and highly individual; in politics, he became a right-wing liberal. Although at heart a very humane man, Goerderler's frigid, spartan belief in hard work and his austere, puritanical morality—he would not tolerate a divorced man or woman in his house—lacked warmth and comradeship. He was, in fact, an autocrat by nature and his commanding personality, combined with his utter belief in the rightness of his point of view, enabled him to persuade weak or uncertain men over-easily to accept his own particular point of view while he was with them

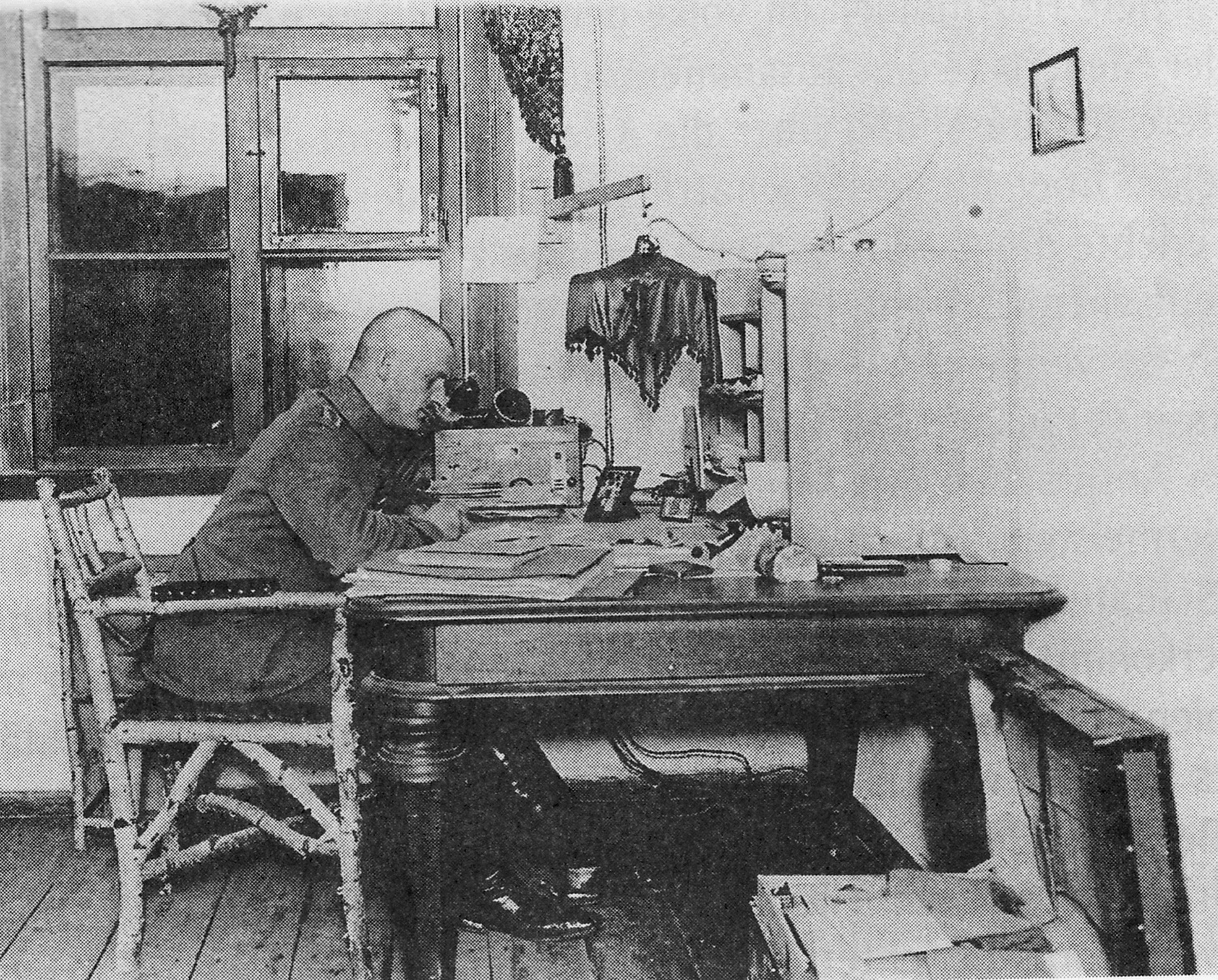
Goerdeler as an officer on the Eastern Front, 1916

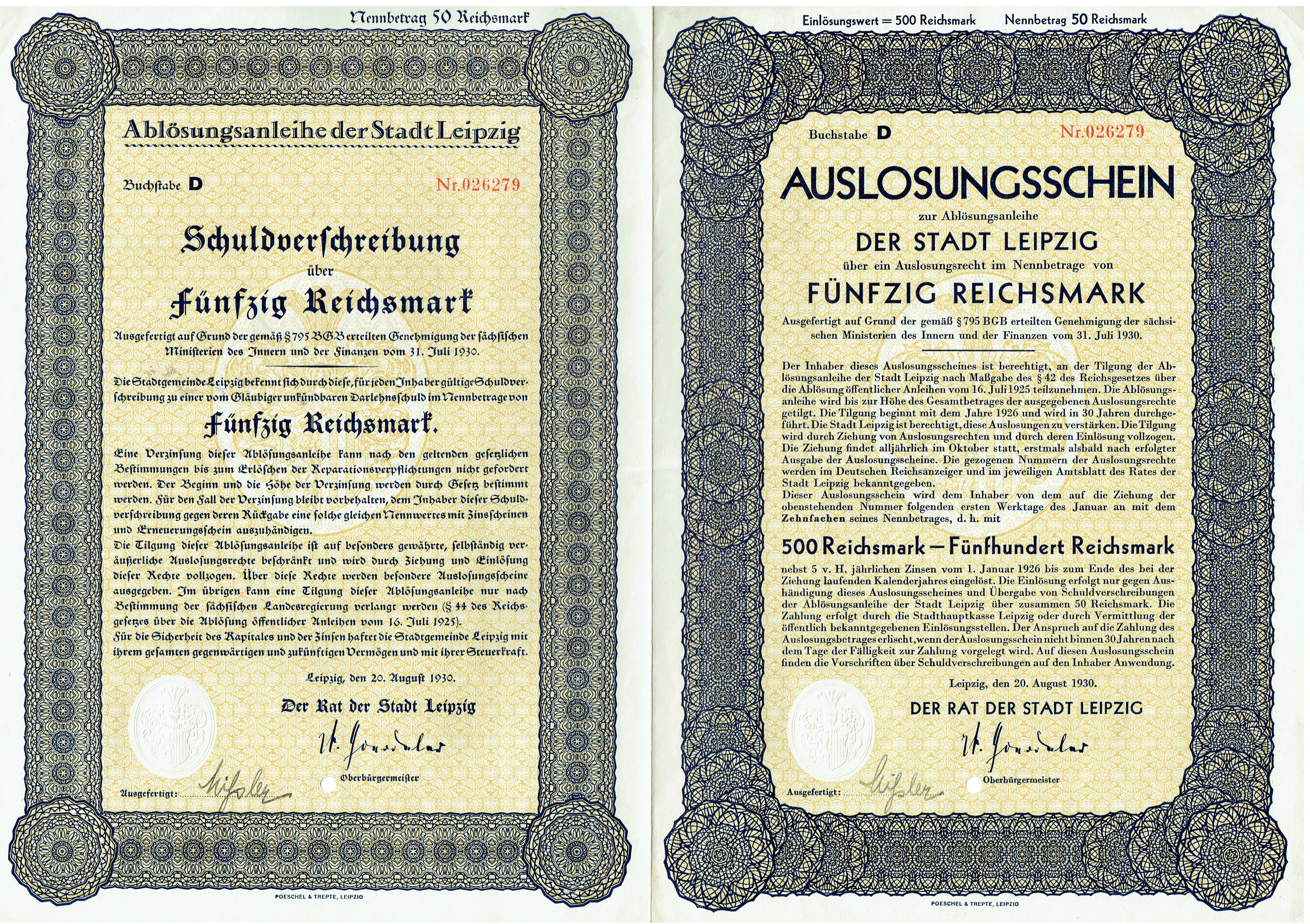
Bond of the city of Leipzig, issued 20 August 1930, signed by mayor Goerdeler.

During the First World War, Goerdeler served as a junior officer on the Eastern Front, rising to the rank of captain. From February 1918 he worked as part of the German military government in Minsk. After the war ended, Goerdeler served on the headquarters of the XVII Army Corps based in Danzig (now Gdańsk in Poland). In June 1919, Goerdeler submitted a memorandum to his superior, General Otto von Below, calling for the destruction of Poland as the only way to prevent territorial losses on Germany's eastern borders.

After his discharge from the German Army, Goerdeler joined the ultraconservative German National People's Party (DNVP). Like most other Germans, Goerdeler strongly opposed the Versailles Treaty of 1919, which forced Germany to cede territories to the restored Polish state. In 1919, before the exact boundaries of the Polish-German border were determined, he suggested restoring West Prussia to Germany. Despite his strong hostile feelings towards Poland, Goerdeler played a key role during the 1920 Polish–Soviet War in breaking a strike by Danzig dockers, who wished to shut down Poland's economy by closing its principal port. He thought that Poland was a less undesirable neighbour than Bolshevik Russia.

In 1922, Goerdeler was elected as mayor (Bürgermeister) of Königsberg (now Kaliningrad, Russia) in East Prussia and later, on 22 May 1930, as mayor of Leipzig. During the Weimar Republic era (1918–1933), Goerdeler was widely regarded as a hard-working and outstanding municipal politician.

On 8 December 1931, Chancellor Heinrich Brüning, a personal friend, appointed Goerdeler as Reich Price Commissioner and entrusted him with the task of overseeing his deflationary policies. The sternness with which Goerdeler administered his task as Price Commissioner made him a well-known figure in Germany. Later he resigned from the DNVP because its leader, Alfred Hugenberg, was a committed foe of the Brüning government.

In the early 1930s, Goerdeler became a leading advocate of the viewpoint that the Weimar Republic had failed, as shown by the Great Depression, and that a conservative revolution was needed to replace democracy.

After the downfall of the Brüning government in 1932, Goerdeler was considered a potential Chancellor. General Kurt von Schleicher sounded him out for the post but eventually Franz von Papen was chosen instead.

After the fall of Brüning's government on 30 May 1932, Brüning recommended Goerdeler to President Paul von Hindenburg as his successor. Hindenburg rejected Goerdeler because of his former membership of the DNVP. (From 1928, under the leadership of Alfred Hugenberg, the DNVP had waged a vituperative campaign against Hindenburg and had even labelled him as one of the "November Criminals" who had allegedly "stabbed Germany in the back" in 1918. As a result, by 1932, no current or even former member of the DNVP was acceptable to Hindenburg as chancellor.)

The fall of Brüning led to Goerdeler's resignation as Price Commissioner. Later in 1932, Goerdeler refused an offer to serve in Papen's cabinet.

== Role in the Nazi government ==
=== Mayor in the Third Reich ===
As late as 1935, Goerdeler considered Adolf Hitler an "enlightened dictator", who, with the proper advice, would be a force for good. Goerdeler later called the period in which he supported the Nazis the only chapter of his life that he found embarrassing. On 1 April 1933, the day of the national boycott declared against all Jewish businesses in the Reich, Goerdeler appeared in full uniform of the Oberbürgermeister of Leipzig to order the SA not to enforce the boycott and ordered the Leipzig police to free several Jews taken hostage by the SA. Several times, he attempted to help Leipzig Jewish businessmen threatened with the "Aryanisation" economic policies of the Nazi regime. A few days after the boycott, Goerdeler found himself as mayor of Leipzig enforcing the Law for the Restoration of the Professional Civil Service, which, unlike the Nuremberg Laws of 1935, did not give him cause for complaint.

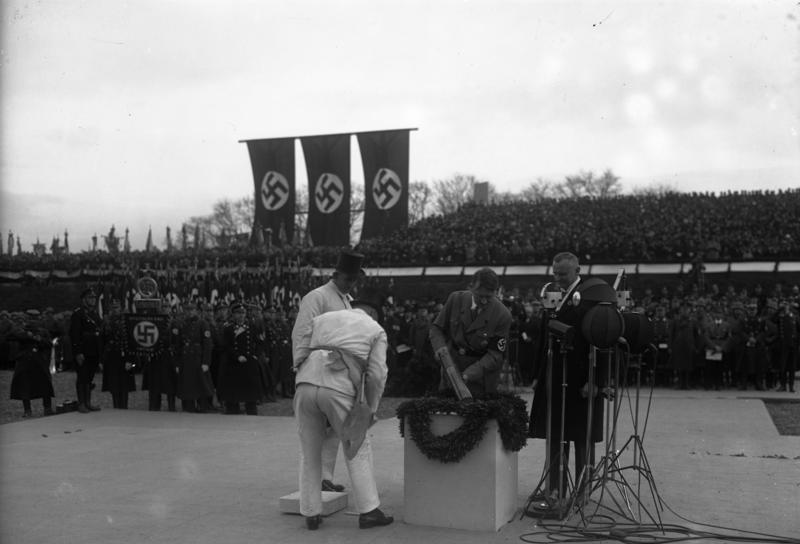
Hitler and Goerdeler during the former's visit to Leipzig, 6 March 1934

As part of his efforts to influence the Nazi regime, Goerdeler had sent Hitler long memoranda containing his advice on economic policy, and in the second half of 1935, he wrote up a new draft law on the powers and responsibilities of municipal governments. He served as a member of Hans Frank's Academy for German Law. Despite his early sympathy for the regime and considerable pressure from the National Socialists, Goerdeler always refused to join the NSDAP. By the mid-1930s, Goerdeler grew increasingly disillusioned with the Nazis as it became more and more apparent that Hitler had no interest in reading any of Goerdeler's memoranda but was instead carrying out economic and financial policies that Goerdeler regarded as highly irresponsible.

In addition, the massive increase in spending by the Leipzig municipal government caused the city's debts to be a major source of worry for Goerdeler. By 1934 he clashed with Hitler over his foreign policy, as Germany signed a nonaggression treaty with Poland to which Goerdeler was opposed and demanded annexation of Polish territories. He wrote to Hitler that continued Polish possession of territories in Gdańsk Pomerania and Greater Poland was a "thorn in country's economic flesh and honour" and that "the German people must fight for security of their existence".

In 1933, a Reich law forbade doctors who were members of the Communist Party of Germany or were "non-Aryans" from participating in public health insurance, exempting only those who were First World War veterans or children or parents of veterans. A second decree of 1934 banned all physicians from participating in public health insurance who had one or more Jewish grandparents regardless of their religion or if they were married to a "non-Aryan". However, the laws did not affect those physicians who received their approbation under the Weimar Republic.

On 9 April 1935, the Deputy Mayor of Leipzig, the National Socialist Rudolf Haake, overstepping existing laws, banned all Jewish doctors from participating in public health insurance and advised all municipal employees not to consult Jewish doctors. In response, the Landesverband Mitteldeutschland des Centralvereins deutscher Staatsbürger jüdischen Glaubens e. V (Middle German Regional Association of the Central Association of German Citizens of Jewish Faith) complained to Goerdeler and asked him to enforce the existing antisemitic laws, which allowed at least some Jewish doctors to practice.

On 11 April 1935, Goerdeler ordered the end of Haake's boycott and provided a list of "non-Aryan" physicians permitted to operate and those excluded. Critics of Goerdeler, such as the American political scientist Daniel Goldhagen, have considered the exclusion list as evidence of Goerdeler's antisemitism. By contrast, defenders like the Canadian historian Peter Hoffmann have argued that Goerdeler's insistence on enforcing the laws served to protect at least some Jewish physicians.

=== Price Commissioner: making economic policy ===
In November 1934, Goerdeler was again appointed Reich Price Commissioner, and ordered to combat the increasingly unpopular inflation caused by rearmament. Gestapo reports from 1934 record that the German public greeted the news of Goerdeler's reappointment as Price Commissioner as a positive development. Despite the great fanfare that greeted Goerdeler's appointment, he was given little real power.

In 1934, Goerdeler was vehemently opposed to the idea of devaluing the Reichsmark and had supported Hitler and Schacht against the advocates of devaluation. During his second term as Price Commissioner in 1934–35, Goerdeler often came into conflict with the Economics Minister and Reichsbank President Hjalmar Schacht over his inflationary policies. In Goerdeler's opinion, they posed a grave danger to the German economy, and finally prompted his resignation in 1935 as Price Commissioner. As Price Commissioner, Goerdeler became increasingly troubled by Nazi economic policies and disgusted by rampant corruption within the Nazi Party. In September 1935, as mayor of Leipzig, Goerdeler found himself enforcing the Nuremberg Laws, which he found deeply distasteful.

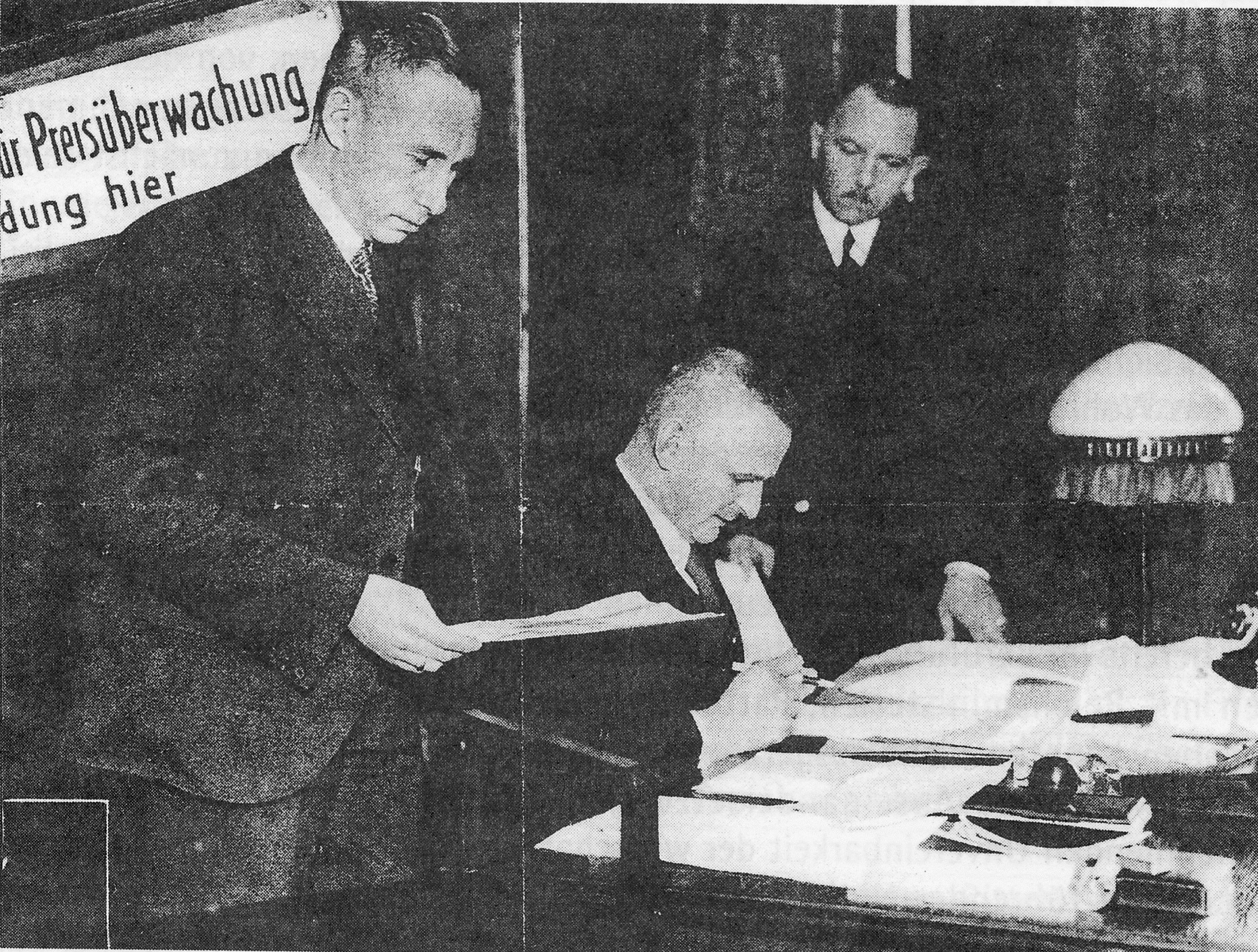
Goerdeler as Price Commissioner, 1934

In October 1935, Goerdeler sent Hitler a memorandum in which he urged that the priorities for the use of German foreign exchange should be shifted from buying raw materials that Germany lacked for rearmament and instead should be used to buy food that Germany lacked such as fats. In his report, Goerdeler wrote that the foremost goal of German economic policy should be "the satisfactory provisioning of the population with fats, even in relation to armaments, as having political priority". In the same report, Goerdeler argued that the root of German economic problems was rearmament, and he advocated as the solution reducing military spending, increasing German exports and returning to a free-market economy.

Goerdeler warned that to continue the present course of increasing statism in the economy and the current levels of high military spending would result in the total collapse of the economy with an extremely drastic drop in living standards. After Hitler ignored Goerdeler's report, Goerdeler asked Hitler to dissolve the Reich Commissariat for Price Surveillance since there was nothing for that office to do. In the spring of 1936, Goerdeler came into increasing conflict with Haake over the question of demolition of a monument to the German-Jewish composer Felix Mendelssohn.

In the summer of 1936, Goerdeler was heavily involved in trying to influence the decisionmaking regarding the great economic crisis, which gripped Germany that year. Despite his earlier differences with Schacht, Goerdeler and Schacht headed the "free-market" faction in the German government and, during the economic crisis of 1936, urged Hitler to reduce military spending, turn away from autarkic and protectionist policies and reduce statism in the economy. Supporting the "free-market" faction were some of Germany's leading business executives, most notably Hermann Duecher of AEG, Robert Bosch of Robert Bosch GmbH and Albert Voegeler of Vereinigte Stahlwerke AG. Goerdeler and Schacht were opposed by another faction centred around Hermann Göring calling for the opposite.

Despite his disagreements with Göring over the best economic course to follow, on 6 August 1936, Göring commissioned a report from Goerdeler as a leading economic expert about whether or not Germany should devalue the Reichsmark. Goerdeler began his report by rejecting the policies of Schacht's New Plan of 1934 as untenable. Making a U-turn from his stance of 1934, Goerdeler now embraced devaluation of the Reichsmark as the best solution to the economic crisis. Goerdeler argued that the tolerance of other Western nations, especially the United States for the German state's subsidising the dumping of exports was wearing thin and would soon result in harsh new tariffs being applied against German goods.

Goerdeler argued that the only way out of the economic crisis, which gripped the German economy in 1936, was the devaluation of the Reichsmark and abandoning all of the restrictions on foreign exchange in Germany. Goerdeler argued that for devaluation of the Reichsmark to be successful would require co-ordination with other nations, especially the United States, the United Kingdom and France, which otherwise might be tempted to engage in competitive devaluations of the dollar, the pound and the franc respectively. To secure their co-operation, Goerdeler argued for rapprochement with the Western powers. In his memorandum for Göring, Goerdeler wrote of the "grandiose possibility" that a German reengagement with the world economy and the end of protectionism and autarchism would lead to a new age of economic co-operation among the world's largest economies.

To that end, Goerdeler argued in exchange for Anglo-French-American economic co-operation and support, Germany should at least cease its unilateral economic policies and sharply cut military spending. In addition, Goerdeler felt that the price of Western economic support would be a moderation of the Nazi regime's policies in regards to the "Jewish question, freemasonry question, question of the rule of law, Church question". Goerdeler wrote, "I can well imagine that we will have to bring certain issues ... into a greater degree of alignment with the imponderable attitudes of other peoples, not in substance, but in the manner of dealing with them".

The British historian Adam Tooze has argued that Goerdeler was following his own agenda in seeking to moderate the regime's domestic policies in his memorandum and that it is highly unlikely that outside powers would have required the concessions on anti-Semitic and other domestic policies that Goerdeler advocated as the price of Western economic support. However, Tooze feels that Goerdeler was correct in arguing that the West would have made cutting military spending a precondition of economic support. Goerdeler argued his policies of economic liberalisation and devaluation would, in the short run, cause 2 million–2.5 million unemployed in Germany but argued that, in the long run, the increase in exports would make the German economy stronger.

In public, Göring called Goerdeler's memorandum "completely unusable." Göring's copy of Goerdeler's memorandum is covered with handwritten personal comments by Göring on the side such as "What cheek!", "Nonsense!", and "Oho!" When Göring forwarded a copy of Goerdeler's memorandum to Hitler, his covering letter stated:

This may be quite important, my Führer, for your memorandum, since it reveals the complete confusion and incomprehension of our bourgeois businessmen, limitation of armaments, defeatism, incomprehension of the foreign policy situation alternate. His [Goerdeler's] recommendations are adequate for a mayor, but not for the state leadership.

Goerdeler's advice was rejected by Hitler in his "Four-Year Plan Memorandum" of August 1936. Instead, in the autumn of 1936, the Nazi regime launched the Four Year Plan as a way out of the 1936 economic crisis. Hitler himself found Goerdeler's report objectionable, and Hitler's "Four-Year Plan Memorandum" may have been written in part as a reply to Goerdeler's memorandum (Gerhard Ritter favoured this theory whereas Gerhard Weinberg rejects it).

On 4 September 1936, speaking before the German Cabinet, Göring cited Goerdeler's memorandum as an example of flawed economic thinking and announced that Germany would pursue heavy military spending, protectionism and autarky, regardless of the economic consequences.

=== Resignation ===
In the autumn of 1936, Goerdeler's ongoing dispute with Haake over the Mendelssohn statue came to a head. After much argument, Goerdeler agreed to have the statue moved from its location in front of the Gewandhaus concert hall to a lower-profile position. In the autumn of 1936, Goerdeler left for a trip to Finland promoted by the German Chamber of Commerce. Before leaving, Goerdeler met with Adolf Hitler and the propaganda minister Joseph Goebbels and received their promise that nothing would happen to the statue during his trip.

During his trip, the statue was demolished on Haake's orders. Upon his return, Haake stated that the matter of the statue was "only the outward occasion of the conflict" and declared that "Dr. Goerdeler's attitude in the Jewish Question had been revealed particularly clearly in the matter of the Mendelssohn-Bartholdy statue". Goerdeler tried to have the statue rebuilt. After failing that, he declined to accept his reelection as mayor of Leipzig and resigned from office on 31 March 1937.

== Opposition to Nazi regime ==
=== Into opposition ===
After his resignation as Oberbürgermeister of Leipzig, Goerdeler was offered the position of heading the finance department at the firm of Krupp AG, then Germany's largest corporation. However, Hitler forbade Goerdeler to take up this appointment and ordered Krupp to withdraw the offer. Goerdeler instead became the director of the overseas sales department at the firm of Robert Bosch GmbH.

Shortly after his resignation, Goerdeler became involved in anti-Nazi plots. Bosch, a friend, agreed to turn a blind eye to his anti-Nazi work. As a conservative and self-proclaimed follower of the Bismarckian tradition, Goerdeler was opposed to what he considered the extreme radicalism of the Nazis and was fearful of what the results of Hitler's foreign policy might be. From 1936, Goerdeler worked to build an opposition faction out of his circle, comprising mostly civil servants and businessmen.

Despite his anti-Nazi plotting, Goerdeler continued to submit memoranda to Hitler and the other Nazi leaders in the hope that he might somehow convince them to change course. The case of Goerdeler has been used by the historian Hans Mommsen to support his view of "resistance as a process", with Goerdeler going from an ally of the regime to increasing disillusionment by Nazi economic policies in the mid-1930s and finally becoming committed to the regime's overthrow by 1937.

By early 1938, Goerdeler was convinced that "something must be done" about the Nazi regime. Describing Goerdeler during this period, the American journalist William L. Shirer wrote that Goerdeler was "A conservative and a monarchist at heart, a devout Protestant, able, energetic and intelligent, but also indiscreet and headstrong" who "went to work with heart and soul in opposition to Hitler".

Using the "cover" of his job as chief of overseas sales at Bosch, between 1937 and 1938, Goerdeler often travelled abroad, mostly to France, the United Kingdom, the United States, the Balkans, the Middle East and Canada, to warn anyone who would listen about what he considered to be the aggressive and dangerous foreign policy of Nazi Germany. Though opposed to what he considered to be a reckless foreign policy, Goerdeler often demanded in his meetings with his foreign friends for the Great Powers to back the cession of the Sudetenland, the Polish Corridor, the Memelland (modern Klaipėda, Lithuania), and the Free City of Danzig and the return of the former German colonies in Africa, to Germany. At the same time, Goerdeler became a member of General Ludwig Beck's private intelligence network.

Goerdeler's reports were received not only by Beck but also by General Werner von Fritsch. The German historian Klaus-Jürgen Müller observed that Goerdeler, in his contacts abroad, tended to falsely portray himself as leading a movement that was more organised than it really was. and that he presented himself to his foreign contacts as the secret spokesman of a well-organised "German Opposition".

Besides trying to influence foreign governments, Goerdeler attempted to use his reports to the Army leadership to try to influence the Army into considering an anti-Nazi putsch. During one of his visits to London, in June 1937, Goerdeler told Sir Robert Vansittart that he would like to see the Nazi regime replaced by a right-wing military dictatorship that would seek British friendship, and Goerdeler wanted, in exchange, British support for annexing parts of Poland and Czechoslovakia. In October 1937, during a visit to the United States, Goerdeler stayed with the British historian Sir John Wheeler-Bennett at the latter's estate in Virginia and informed him of his desire to restore the monarchy in Germany. During the same trip, Goerdeler drafted his "Political Testament", attacking Nazi economic policies and criticized the regime for its anti-Christian policies, widespread corruption and lawlessness. Goerdeler met several times with Winston Churchill and Vansittart.

=== 1938: first attempt at a putsch ===
During the Blomberg–Fritsch Affair and the attendant crisis caused by the court-martial of General Werner von Fritsch, Goerdeler became closely associated with several loose groupings of German rightists in the Civil Service and the military who, for various reasons, were unhappy with aspects of the Third Reich. Goerdeler attempted to use the Fritsch crisis to try to turn the Army leadership against the Nazi regime, but his efforts were in vain.

In April 1938, Goerdeler visited London, where he advised the British government both to resist the Nazi claim to the Sudetenland area of Czechoslovakia and to declare that he wanted to see the area transferred to Germany as soon as possible. As Gerhard Weinberg observed, Goerdeler's contradictory statements left the British somewhat confused. In the spring of 1938, Goerdeler, in association with Hans von Dohnanyi, Colonel Hans Oster and Johannes Popitz, became involved in planning a putsch against the Nazi regime should the regime launch Fall Grün, the codename for the invasion of Czechoslovakia. In June 1938, Beck often consulted with Goerdeler over the question of whether or not he should resign as Chief of the General Staff as a way of stopping Fall Grün.

Vansittart introduced Goerdeler to one of his spies, the British industrialist A.P. Young, who was a close business partner to several German corporations and so often visited Germany. Because Young did frequent business with Bosch and because of Goerdeler's position there, the two could meet often without raising suspicion. In August 1938, Goerdeler started to leak information to London and informed the British that Hitler intended to launch Fall Grün in September 1938. In August 1938, Goerdeler met with Young in the village of Rauschen Dune in East Prussia. During his meeting with Young, Goerdeler asked for Young to convey a message to the British government to the effect that London should apply diplomatic and economic pressure on Germany to cease the persecution of the Jews. To have more frequent meetings with his British contacts, Goerdeler stayed in Switzerland in August–October 1938.

Though the British politicians and civil servants who met with Goerdeler were impressed with his honesty and earnestness, it was judged too risky by the Chamberlain government in 1938 to stake all upon the Goerdeler's projected putsch, especially since success was uncertain at best, and discovery of British backing for an unsuccessful putsch was likely to cause the war the Chamberlain government was seeking to avert in 1938.

Moreover, as one British civil servant wrote on 22 August 1938:

We have had similar visits from other emissaries of the Reichsheer, such as Dr. Goerdeler, but those for whom these emissaries claim to speak have never given us any reasons to suppose that they would be able or willing to take action such as would lead to the overthrow of the regime. The events of June 1934 [the Night of the Long Knives] and February 1938 [the Blomberg–Fritsch Affair] do not lead one to attach much hope to energetic action by the Army against the regime.

Ulrich von Hassell wrote in his diary that Goerdeler was "imprudent" but at least "wants to act rather than grumble", which was a marked difference to the generals who indicated that perhaps they would or perhaps they would not act against the Nazi regime should Czechoslovakia be attacked. In the tense atmosphere of September 1938, with the crisis in Central Europe looking likely to explode into war at any moment, Goerdeler was waiting anxiously for the putsch to overthrow the Nazi regime, and his taking over the reins of the German state as the new Chancellor. During his planning for the coup, Goerdeler was in contact with Chinese intelligence, using General Alexander von Falkenhausen as intermediary. Like most German conservatives, Goerdeler favoured Germany's traditional informal alliance with China, and was strongly opposed to the volte-face in Germany's Far Eastern policies effected in early 1938 by the Foreign Minister Joachim von Ribbentrop, who abandoned the alliance with China for an alignment with Japan. In a September 1938 meeting with Young, the latter reported that "X" (as Goerdeler was code-named by the British) had stated about the domestic situation in Germany: "the working classes are nervous, distrustful of the Leader. Their allegiance is doubtful." In another meeting on 11 September 1938 in Zurich, Young recorded Goerdeler as saying:

the feeling among the people against the war is welling up at an alarming rate. His [Goerdeler's] recent talks with leading industrialists had satisfied him that the workers' feelings have been bitterly roused to the point where, if they were in possession of arms, they would physically revolt against the regime

On 29 September 1938 Goerdeler informed the British, through one of Vansittart's contacts, Colonel Graham Christie, that the mobilization of the Royal Navy was turning German public opinion against the regime. The British historian Sir John Wheeler-Bennett, who knew Goerdeler well, noted that Goerdeler failed to realize that Hitler was not bluffing with Fall Grün and had every intention of attacking Czechoslovakia on 1 October 1938, and that he regarded Munich as a personal set-back. In 1938, Goerdeler was deeply disappointed with the Munich Agreement, which in his view, though it turned over the Sudetenland to Germany, was undesirable in that it removed what Goerdeler considered to be best chance of a putsch against the Nazi regime. After the Munich Agreement, Goerdeler wrote to one of his American friends:

The German people did not want war; the Army would have done anything to avoid it; ... the world had been warned and informed in good time. If the warning had been heeded and acted upon Germany would by now be free of its dictator and turning against Mussolini. Within a few weeks we could have begun to build lasting world peace on the basis of justice, reason and decency. A purified Germany with a government of decent people would have been ready to solve the Spanish problem without delay in company with Britain and France, to remove Mussolini and with the United States to create peace in the Far East. The way would have been open for sound co-operation in economic and social fields, for the creation of peaceful relations between Capital, Labour and the State, for the raising of ethical concepts and for a fresh attempt to raise the general standard of living.

In the same letter, Goerdeler wrote "You can hardly conceive the despair that both people and the Army feel about the brutal, insane and terroristic dictator and his henchmen". Wheeler-Bennett commented that Goerdeler was vastly exaggerating the extent of anti-Nazi feelings, both in the German Army and among the German public. After Munich, Goerdeler told Young that:

It is vitally important to realise that Hitler is deeply and definitely convinced that after his unexpected victory at Munich, anything is possible to him ... He says that he [Hitler] is now convinced that England is degenerate, weak, timid and never will have the guts to resist any of his plans. No war will ever be needed against either England or France

In November 1938, when Sir Nevile Henderson, the British Ambassador to Germany went on sick leave, the acting heads of the Embassy in Berlin sent a series of reports to the Foreign Secretary Lord Halifax intended to effect a change in British policy towards Germany. Goerdeler emerged as one of the Embassy's leading informants.

=== As agent "X" ===
In November 1938, Goerdeler met with Young in Switzerland and asked if the British government could intercede on the behalf of 10,000 Polish Jews the Germans had expelled from Germany, whom the Poles refused to accept. Goerdeler declared that the treatment of the Polish Jews, stranded on the German-Polish border, was "barbaric". In December 1938–January 1939, Goerdeler had a further series of meetings with Young in Switzerland, where he informed Young that the Kristallnacht pogrom of November 1938 had been ordered by Hitler personally and was not a "spontaneous" demonstration as the Nazis had claimed.

Goerdeler recommended that Young inform London that as soon as "the new persecution of the Jews is started, it is absolutely essential to break diplomatic relations". Goerdeler also informed Young of his belief that Hitler was seeking world conquest, and that the Führer had "decided to destroy the Jews-Christianity-Capitalism". Speaking to Young about the economic situation in Germany, Goerdeler stated:

Economic and financial situation gravely critical. Inner situation desperate. Economic conditions getting worse.

Goerdeler's reports to Young were later published by the latter in 1974 as The "X" Documents.

In December 1938, Goerdeler again visited Britain, where he alienated the British civil servants he met by his extreme German nationalist language and demands for British support for the return of Danzig, the Polish Corridor and the former German colonies in Africa, and for making a huge loan to a post-Nazi Germany. Goerdeler asked Frank Ashton-Gwatkin of the Foreign Office to ensure that Britain gave a post-Nazi government an interest-free loan of £500 million in exchange for which Goerdeler would end protectionism, end the efforts to place the Balkans into the German sphere of influence and support Britain in the Mediterranean against Italy and in the Far East against Japan. In addition, both Goerdeler's exaggeration of extent of anti-Nazi feeling in Germany and his inability to organise a putsch were increasingly clear to the British. Sir Alexander Cadogan wrote about Goerdeler's offer, "We are to deliver the goods and Germany gives I.O.Us". Chamberlain was more hostile and wrote, "These people must do their own job".

In the same month, Goerdeler wrote his "World Peace Programme" calling an international conference of all the world's leading powers to consider disarmament, a "moral code" for relations between the states and the stabilisation of the various currencies. The end of Goerdeler's "World Peace Programme" read "Whoever abstains from co-operating wants war and is a breaker of the peace."

== German Resistance ==
=== Prelude to Second World War ===
Despite what Goerdeler perceived as a major setback after Munich, he continued with his efforts to bring about the downfall of the Nazi regime. Goerdeler, an unyielding optimist, believed that if only he could convince enough people, he could overthrow the Nazi regime. Goerdeler believed that through sheer force of will and the goodness of his cause that he could bring down the Nazi regime. Goerdeler spent much of the winter of 1938–39 holding discussions with General Beck, the diplomat Ulrich von Hassell and Erwin Planck about how best to overthrow the Nazi regime. At the same time, Hitler grew increasingly annoyed with Goerdeler's memoranda urging him to exercise caution. Goerdeler, together with Dr. Schacht, General Beck, Hassell and the economist Rudolf Brinkmann, were described by Hitler as "the overbred intellectual circles" who were trying to block him from fulfilling his mission by their appeals to caution, and but for the fact that he needed their skills "otherwise, perhaps we could someday exterminate them or do something of this kind to them".

During the winter of 1938–39, Goerdeler sent reports to the British that stated that Hitler was pressuring Italy into attacking France, planning to launch a surprise air offensive against Britain to achieve a "knock-out blow" by razing British cities to the ground sometime in the second half of February 1939, and considering an invasion of Switzerland and the Low Countries before an attack on France and Britain. Unknown to Goerdeler, he was transmitting false information provided by the Abwehr chief Admiral Wilhelm Canaris and General Hans Oster, who was hoping that the reports might lead to a change in British foreign policy. Canaris and Oster achieved their purpose as Goerdeler's disinformation resulted in first the "Dutch War Scare", which gripped the British government in late January 1939 and led to the public declarations by British Prime Minister Neville Chamberlain in February that any German attack upon France, Switzerland and the Low Countries would be automatically considered the casus belli for an Anglo-German war and would lead to the British "continental commitment" to defend France with a large ground force.

On 16 March 1939, Goerdeler suggested to Young that Britain call an international conference to discuss "legitimate" German demands for changes in the international order. Goerdeler claimed that Hitler would refuse to attend the conference, which would so discredit him as to bring about his downfall. Young passed on Goerdeler's conference idea to Cordell Hull, who was so impressed that he offered to bring about the proposed conference to be chaired by US President Franklin D. Roosevelt. That was the origin of Roosevelt's famous appeal to Hitler and Mussolini on 15 April 1939 for both leaders to publicly promise not to disturb the peace for the next ten years. In exchange, Roosevelt promised a new economic international order.

In the second half of March 1939, Goerdeler together with Schacht and Hans Bernd Gisevius visited Ouchy, Switzerland, to meet with a senior French Deuxième Bureau intelligence agent representing French Prime Minister Édouard Daladier Goerdeler told the agent that the strain of massive military spending had left the German economy on the verge of collapse; that Hitler was determined to use the Danzig issue as an excuse to invade Poland, which in itself was only a prelude for a German seizure of all of Eastern Europe; that a forceful Anglo-French diplomatic stand could deter Hitler; and that if Hitler were deterred long enough, the economic collapse of Germany would cause the downfall of his regime. In April 1939, during a secret meeting with the British diplomat Sir Gladwyn Jebb, Goerdeler stated that if the British continued with their "containment" policy adopted in March 1939, then they might see the "Hitler adventure ... liquidated before the end of June [1939]." There is considerable debate as to the accuracy of that information, with some historians such as Richard Overy arguing that Goerdeler and other German conservatives had exaggerated German economic problems to the British and the French. Overy charged that Goerdeler wanted a very firm Anglo-French stand in favour of Poland in the hope that if confronted with such a situation, the German Army would overthrow Hitler, rather than risk a world war, and so Goerdeler exaggerated the economic problems of the Reich to encourage such a stand.

The "X documents" and how to interpret them played a key role in the debate in the late 1980s between Overy and the Marxist Timothy Mason about whether the German attack on Poland was a "flight into war" forced on Hitler by an economic crisis. Other historians have contended that Goerdeler's information about German economic problems was correct and have pointed to the fact that only massive Soviet economic support, combined with plundering occupied lands, saved the German economy from collapse during the winter of 1939–40. Even with Soviet economic support (especially oil) and the exploitation of Poland and the Reich Protectorate of Bohemia-Moravia, the impact of the British blockade caused a 75% decline in value and tonnage of German imports during the Phoney War.

On 6 May 1939, Goerdeler leaked information to the British Foreign Office stating that the German and Soviet governments were secretly beginning a rapprochement, with the aim of dividing Eastern Europe between them. In May 1939, Goerdeler visited London to repeat the same message to the British government. During his London trip, Goerdeler told the British that the state of the German economy was so deplorable that war, even if it occurred, would only accelerate the German economic collapse and that Germany simply lacked the economic staying power for an extended war. During the same visit to London in May 1939, Goerdeler claimed that the German Army leadership was willing to overthrow the regime, that he himself favoured launching a putsch immediately, but that "the leaders of the whole movement ... still considered it too early". The German historian Klaus-Jürgen Müller commented that Goerdeler in making these claims was either lying to the British or else was seriously self-deluded. Goerdeler's assessment of the German diplomatic-military-economic situation had considerable influence on decision-makers in the British and French governments in 1939, who, based on his reports, believed that a firm Anglo-French diplomatic stand for Poland might bring about the fall of Hitler without a war or, at least, would ensure that the Allies faced war on relatively auspicious economic terms.

Besides trying to influence opinion abroad, Goerdeler urged the German military to overthrow Hitler and frequently found himself frustrated by the unwillingness of the generals to consider a putsch. In a memo written at the end of July 1939 during a visit to Turkey, Goerdeler took the view that Hitler was bluffing in his demands against Poland, and if he could be forced to stand down by a firm Anglo-French stand, that would be such a blow as to topple the Nazi regime. Later, as the summer of 1939 went on, Goerdeler changed his views about Hitler's intentions towards Poland. In August 1939, Goerdeler contacted General Walter von Brauchitsch and advised him if Germany attacked Poland, the result would not be the limited war that Hitler expected but a world war pitting Germany against Britain and France. Goerdeler advised Brauchitsch that the only way to save Germany from such a war would be a putsch to depose Hitler. Brauchitsch was not interested in Goerdeler's opinions, and told him that he shared Hitler's belief that Germany could destroy Poland without causing a world war in 1939. On 25 August 1939, discovering that the German-Soviet Non-Aggression Pact had not led as intended to the Anglo-French abandonment of Poland, Hitler ordered the temporary postponement of Fall Weiss, which had been due to begin the next day. Goerdeler was convinced that the postponement was a fatal blow to Hitler's prestige.

On 26 August, he went to a trip to Sweden that he had been considering cancelling because of the international situation. On 27 August 1939 Goerdeler told the British diplomat Gladwyn Jebb to continue to make a firm diplomatic stand for Poland as the best way of bringing down the Nazi regime. At the same time, Goerdeler's insistence on restoring Germany to its 1914 borders and his intense German nationalism left many British diplomats to mistrust Goerdeler as they regarded him as not much different from Hitler. At the beginning of September 1939, Goerdeler returned to Germany a dejected man. Goerdeler was most disappointed and unpleasantly surprised when Germany attacked Poland on 1 September, the Anglo-French declarations of war on 3 September and then the German Army doing nothing to overthrow Hitler. That marked the beginning of a recurring pattern where Goerdeler would invest great hopes in his beloved German Army rising up against Hitler, only to discover repeatedly that Army officers much preferred to fight for the Führer to fighting against him.

=== Phoney War, the Zossen putsch attempt of November 1939 and attack on the West ===
In 1939–40, Goerdeler assembled conservative politicians, diplomats and generals, most notably Ulrich von Hassell, General Ludwig Beck and Johannes Popitz, in opposition to Adolf Hitler. On 11 October 1939 speaking to Hassel of German war crimes in Poland, Goerdeler commented that both General Halder and Admiral Canaris were afflicted with nervous complaints as a result of "our brutal conduct of the war" in Poland. In October 1939, Goerdeler drafted peace terms that a post-Nazi government would seek with Great Britain and France. Under Goerdeler's terms, Germany would retain all the areas of Poland that had been part of Germany prior to 1918, Austria and the Sudetenland with independence being restored to Poland and Czechoslovakia with general disarmament, the restoration of global free trade and the ending of protectionism as the other major goals for the new regime. On 3 November 1939, Goerdeler paid another visit to Sweden, where he met Marcus Wallenberg, Gustav Cassell, and Dr. Sven Hedin. Hedin wrote in his diary that "he [Goerdeler] believed in Göring and thought that a speedy peace was the only thing to save Germany, but that peace was unthinkable so long as Hitler remained at the head of affairs". At the same time, Goerdeler was deeply involved in the planning of an abortive putsch intended to be launched on 5 November 1939, and as such was in very high spirits prior to that day. Hassell wrote in his diary that with worry that "He [Goerdeler] often reminds me of Kapp." (Wolfgang Kapp, the nominal leader of the Kapp Putsch was notorious for his irresponsibility). The proposed putsch became stillborn when Field Marshal Walter von Brauchitsch and General Franz Halder, the leaders of the planned putsch got cold feet, and dropped their support. Brauchitsch and Halder had decided to overthrow Hitler after the latter had fixed "X-day" for the invasion of France for 12 November 1939; an invasion that both officers believed to be doomed to fail. During a meeting with Hitler on 5 November, Brauchitsch had attempted to talk Hitler into putting off "X-day" by saying that morale in the German Army was worse than what it was in 1918, a statement that enraged Hitler who harshly berated Brauchitsch for incompetence. After that meeting, both Halder and Brauchitsch told Goerdeler that overthrowing Hitler was simply something that they could not do, and he should find other officers if that was what he really wanted to do. Equally important, on 7 November 1939 following heavy snowstorms, Hitler put off "X-Day" until further notice, which removed the reason that had most motivated Brauchitsch and Halder to consider overthrowing Hitler. On 23 November 1939, Goerdeler met with Halder to ask him to re-consider his attitude. Halder gave Goerdeler the following reasons why he wanted nothing to do with any plot to overthrow Hitler:

- That General Erich Ludendorff had launched the Kaiserschlacht in March 1918, which led directly to Germany's defeat in November 1918, but most people in Germany still considered Ludendorff one of Germany's greatest heroes. By contrast, the men who staged the November Revolution and signed the armistice that took Germany out of a losing war were hated all over the Reich as the "November Criminals". Even if Hitler were to launch an invasion of France that signally failed, most people would still support Hitler, just as the failure of the Kaiserschlacht had failed to hurt Ludendorff's reputation as it should have, so the Army could do nothing to overthrow Hitler until the unlikely event that his prestige was badly damaged. Until Hitler was discredited, anyone who acted against him to end the war would be a "new November Criminal".
- That Hitler was a great leader, and there was nobody to replace him.
- Most of the younger officers in the Army were extreme National Socialists who would not join a putsch.
- Hitler deserved "a last chance to deliver the German people from the slavery of English capitalism".
- Finally, "one does not rebel when face to face with the enemy".

Despite all of Goerdeler's best efforts, Halder would not change his mind.

In January–February 1940, Goerdeler together with Popitz, Beck and Hassell spent most of their time working on the sort of constitutional, economic, social and educational system that a post-Nazi government would have to carry out. The basis of all their planning was the restoration of the monarchy. Goerdeler believed that the main reason why the Army would not overthrow Hitler was the lack of a positive goal to inspire them with the hope of a better tomorrow, and if he and his colleagues could work out plans for a better future, then the Army leaders would change their minds. During their discussions for a post-Hitler future, it was agreed that various Nazi leaders like Hermann Göring and Heinrich Himmler, provided that they were willing to break with Hitler could have a leading role in a post-Nazi government. The only Nazi leader besides Hitler whom Goerdeler and his circle were adamant could play no role in a post-Nazi government was the Foreign Minister Joachim von Ribbentrop who Goerdeler personally hated as an obnoxious bully, and whose foreign policy Goerdeler viewed as criminally inept. In early April 1940, Goerdeler met secretly with General Franz Halder, the Chief of the General Staff, and asked him to consider a putsch while the Phoney War was still on, while the British and French were still open to a negotiated peace. Halder refused Goerdeler's request. Goerdeler told Halder that too many people had already died in the war, and this refusal to remove Hitler at this point would ensure that the blood of millions would be on his hands.

Halder told Goerdeler that his oath to Hitler and his belief in Germany's inevitable victory in the war precluded his acting against the Nazi regime. Halder told Goerdeler that "The military situation of Germany, particularly on account of the pact of non-aggression with the Soviet Union is such that a breach of my oath to the Führer could not possibly be justified" [Halder was referring to the Hitler oath], that only if Germany was faced with total defeat would he consider breaking his oath, and that Goerdeler was a fool to believe that the Second World War could be ended with a compromise peace. Halder ended his meeting with Goerdeler on 6 April 1940 with the remark:

Britain and France had declared war on us, and one had to see it through. A peace of compromise was senseless. Only in the greatest emergency could one take the action desired by Goerdeler

In June 1940, much to Goerdeler's intense disappointment, following the German victory over France, the German Army lost all interest in anti-Nazi plots. Not until December 1941, after the first German defeats in the Soviet Union, were Army officers again to show interest in becoming involved in Goerdeler's anti-Nazi plots. In June 1941, Goerdeler experienced a brief surge of hope that he learned that Hitler had issued a set of orders to the Army for the upcoming Operation Barbarossa that violated international law and made it clear that he wanted the war against the Soviet Union to be waged in the most inhumane, brutal way possible. Goerdeler argued that the Army would now overthrow Hitler because no self-respecting German officer would wage war in such an inhumane fashion and become a war criminal. The sequel was recorded in Hassell's diary on 16 June 1941:

"Brauchitsch and Halder have already agreed to Hitler's tactics [in the Soviet Union]. Thus the Army must assume the onus of the murders and burnings which up to now have been confined to the SS.

A series of conferences with Popitz, Goerdeler, Beck and Oster to consider whether certain orders which Army commanders have received (but which they have not yet issued) might suffice to open the eyes of the military leaders to the nature of the regime for which they are fighting. These orders concern brutal ... measures the troops are to take against the Bolsheviks when the Soviet Union is invaded.

We came to the conclusion that nothing was to be hoped for now ... They [the generals] delude themselves ... Hopeless sergeant majors!"

=== Leader of the national conservative opposition ===
==== Plans for the future ====
During the winter of 1940–1941, Goerdeler spent much of his time discussing with Popitz, Beck and Hassell which of the Hohenzollerns would occupy the throne of Germany after the overthrow of the Nazis. Goerdeler supported the claim of Prince Oskar of Prussia. The idea of restoring the former Emperor Wilhelm II to his throne was rejected by Goerdeler under the grounds that the personality of the former Kaiser and the way he had behaved during his thirty-year reign made him a completely unsuitable candidate. The Crown Prince Wilhelm was rejected by Goerdeler partly because his well deserved reputation as a womaniser, a heavy drinker and an irresponsible playboy made him offensive to the austere, God-fearing Lutheran Goerdeler and partly because of his outspoken support for the Nazi regime. Popitz by contrast, while agreeing with Goerdeler that the unstable former Kaiser was unsuitable, insisted on dynastic grounds that the Crown Prince Wilhelm be the next emperor, and was to spend much time arguing with Goerdeler over which of the sons of the former emperor was to sit on the throne. They developed a future constitution for Germany and even a list of potential ministers. Popitz favored a return to the pre-1918 authoritarian political system. However, Goerdeler argued with his fellow conspirators in favor of a British-style constitutional monarchy with an emperor who was "not meant to govern, but to watch over the Constitution and to represent the State".

Goerdeler's proposed constitution called for a strong executive, a high degree of decentralisation, a Reichstag elected partially by the people on a British-style "first-past-the-post" basis (instead of by party lists) and partially by members of local councils, and a Reichsrat composed of representatives nominated by Christian churches, trade unions, universities, and business groups. To assist with the drafting of the future constitution, Goerdeler enlisted the help, through his friend Dietrich Bonhoeffer, of the so-called Freiburger Kreis (Freiburg Circle), an anti-Nazi discussion group of professors at Freiburg University founded in 1938 that included Adolf Lampe, Erik Wolf, Walter Eucken, Constantin von Dietze, and Gerhard Ritter. Had the 20 July Plot succeeded, Goerdeler would have served as Chancellor in the new government that would have been formed after Hitler's assassination and the overthrow of the Nazi regime. In August 1941, Goerdeler was most disappointed with the Atlantic Charter. He felt that the demands contained in Clause 8, calling for the disarmament of Germany, would make both the task of recruiting the German Army to overthrowing the regime more difficult and were unacceptable since Goerdeler believed in maintaining a strong military". Starting in 1941, Goerdeler expanded his network of anti-Nazi contacts to include Social Democrats like Wilhelm Leuschner and Hermann Maas.

==== Reaction to news of genocide ====
In late 1941, under the impact of the news of the deportations of German Jews to be shot in Eastern Europe, Goerdeler submitted a memo to the German government calling for all Jews who had been German citizens or were descended from Jews who had been German citizens before 1871 to be classified as Germans, and those Jews who were descended from Jews who had not lived within the borders of Germany prior to 1871 to be considered citizens of a Jewish state whose creation would occur later. In the memo entitled Das Ziel ("The Goal"), Goerdeler wrote that a Jewish state should be created somewhere in South America or Canada to which almost the entire Jewish population of Europe would be deported; only German-Jewish veterans of World War I or those German Jews descended from Jews who were German citizens in 1871 would be allowed to stay. Meanwhile, pending the deportation of the Jews to the Americas, Goerdeler called in "The Goal" for the Nuremberg Laws to stay in force while demanding the repeal of the post-Kristallnacht anti-Semitic laws. Some controversy has been attracted by this memo. Goerdeler's critics are offended by his suggestion that German Jews whose ancestors had not lived within the borders of the German Empire before 1 July 1871 should not be considered German citizens, but Goerdeler's defenders such as the Canadian historian Peter Hoffmann have argued that Goerdeler was trying to present the Nazi regime with an alternative to genocide. The German historian Hans Mommsen wrote that Goerdeler's anti-Semitism was typical of the German right in which Jews were widely considered to be part of an alien body living in Germany. Mommsen went on to comment that given Goerdeler's background in the fiercely anti-Semitic German National People's Party, what is surprising was not his anti-Jewish prejudices, but rather that he was able to make any sort of moral objection to Nazi anti-Semitism. In January 1942, Goerdeler submitted another memo to the German government protesting at the deportation of Leipzig Jews. In April 1942, during another visit to Sweden, Goerdeler contacted the Wallenberg family and asked it to contact Winston Churchill about the peace terms that the British would conclude with Germany once the Nazi regime was overthrown. In May 1942, Goerdeler was much saddened when his son Christian was killed in action while serving on the Eastern Front.

==== Recruiting for the resistance ====
In November 1942, Goerdeler made a secret and illegal visit to Smolensk using forged papers provided by Colonel Hans Oster to meet Field Marshal Günther von Kluge and Henning von Tresckow to gain their support for overthrowing Hitler. Both Kluge and Tresckow promised to arrest Hitler when he visited the Eastern front. Tresckow in particular was very favourably impressed with Goerdeler, whom he saw as a kindred spirit. Goerdeler returned to Berlin feeling assured about the future, and was most disappointed when he received a message from Kluge via General Beck stating he changed his mind about acting against the Nazi regime, and to count him out of any putsch. Kluge's change of mind about attempting to overthrow Hitler was related to the "gifts" he had received from Hitler in the fall of 1942. On 30 October 1942 Kluge was the beneficiary of an enormous bribe from Hitler who mailed a letter of good wishes together with a huge cheque totaling 250,000 marks made out to him from the German treasury and a promise that whatever improving his estate might cost could be billed out to the German treasury. Hitler was unaware of Goerdeler's plotting, but had heard rumours that Kluge was unhappy with his leadership. After receiving another "gift" of 250,000 marks from Hitler later in November that was intended to buy his loyalty, it had the desired effect with Kluge's message to Goerdeler not to involve him in anti-Nazi plots.

The corruption of the German officer corps by the Nazi regime via generous bribes was a source of considerable disgust and exasperation to Goerdeler. One of Goerdeler's contacts with the Army, a Captain Hermann Kaiser informed Goerdeler that all of the senior officers were taking huge bribes from Hitler in exchange for their loyalty. By May 1943, Goerdeler was well aware that Field Marshal Günther von Kluge, General Heinz Guderian and Field Marshal Gerd von Rundstedt had accepted 250,000 Reichsmark cheques as birthday presents from Hitler that were intended to bribe them into loyalty, and that in addition, Guderian had received an estate in Poland. Since these were all men that Goerdeler had hopes of recruiting, their refusal to join the conspiracy because of their greed for more bribes enraged Goerdeler. Goerdeler wrote with disgust in May 1943 that the senior officers "think only of helping themselves".

In December 1942, the "Freiburg Circle" who were continuing their work helping Goerdeler develop a constitution submitted the "Great Memorandum" to Goerdeler for the proposed post-Nazi German government, which also included "Proposals for a Solution of the Jewish Question in Germany". The "Proposals" rejected Nazi racial theories but stated that after the overthrow of the Nazis, German Jews would not have their German citizenship restored but be restricted to living in ghettos and be allowed only minimal contact with German Christians, and he called for continuing the Nazi ban on marriage and sex between Jews and German Christians. The Israeli historian Saul Friedländer used the "Proposals" to argue that Goerdeler was anti-Semitic, and that his differences with the Nazis on the "Jewish Question" were ones of degree, not kind.

After the Battle of Stalingrad, the pace of Goerdeler's conspiratorial activities gathered speed. Between November 1942 and November 1943, Goerdeler was in regular contact with his friends, the Wallenberg family of Sweden whom he used as middle-men in his efforts to make contact with the British and American governments. On 22 January 1943, at the home of Peter Yorck von Wartenburg, Goerdeler met with the Kreisau Circle during which he argued and debated forcefully about the social and economic policies to be pursued by a post-Nazi government. Only with some difficulty were Ulrich von Hassell and Fritz-Dietlof von der Schulenburg able to patch up a measure of agreement between the Kreisau Circle and Goerdeler. Those present at the meeting of 22 January were Goerdeler, Hassell, General Beck, Johannes Popitz and Jens Jessens for the conservative faction and von der Schulenburg, Yorck von Wartenburg, Eugen Gerstenmaier, Adam von Trott zu Solz and Helmuth James Graf von Moltke for the left-learning Kreisau Circle. In March 1943, Goerdeler wrote a letter addressed to several German Army officers appealing to them to overthrow the Nazis and demanding that just one line divide Germans: "that between decent and non-decent." Goerdeler went on to write: "How is it possible that so basically decent a people as the Germans can put up for so long with such an intolerable system? Only because all offences against law and decency are carried out under the protection of secrecy and under the pressures of terror" Goerdeler argued that if only a situation were created "in which, if only for twenty-four hours, it [were] possible for the truth to be spoken again", then the Nazi regime would collapse like a house of cards.

In May 1943, Goerdeler submitted a memo to the Wallenbergs, which he asked them to pass on to the Anglo-Americans outlining his thoughts on the German–Polish border. In the same memo, Goerdeler called for a "European community" comprising a German-dominated confederation, which in turn was to be sub-divided into an Eastern European confederation consisting of Poland, Lithuania, Latvia and Estonia, a confederation of the Scandinavian states, a South European confederation, and a Balkan confederation. The "European confederation" was to be one economic unit with one military ruled over by a Council consisting of two representatives from every state, who would elect a European President for a four-year term. Helping the Council and the President was to be a Federal Assembly to which each of the various confederations would send five to ten members based on their populations. Finally, the European confederation was to serve as the nucleus of a "World Confederation of Nations" that would banish war everywhere, and promote peace and prosperity.

During the spring of 1943, Goerdeler grew increasingly impatient with the military end of the conspiracy, complaining that those officers involved in the plot were better at finding excuses for inaction than reasons for action, a sentiment he expressed in a 1943 letter to General Friedrich Olbricht

Goerdeler had great faith in his idea that if only he could meet with Hitler and explain to him that his leadership was grossly inadequate on military and economic grounds, then Hitler could be persuaded to resign in his favor, thereby ending Nazi Germany through non-violent means. It took considerable effort on the part of Goerdeler's friends to talk him out of this plan. After a visit to western Germany, where Goerdeler was horrified by the damage caused by Anglo–American bombing, Goerdeler, in July 1943 wrote a letter to Field Marshal Günther von Kluge criticising him for his continued support of a regime that was leading the nation into ruin. Kluge refused to answer Goerdeler's letter, despite the fact that Goerdeler was all but calling the Field-Marshal a coward for his refusal to join the conspiracy.

==== Towards the putsch of 20 July: late 1943–early 1944 ====
In August 1943, Goerdeler and his friend, the Oberbürgermeister of Stuttgart, the disillusioned SA-Brigadeführer Karl Strölin sent a joint memo to the Reich Interior Minister, the Reichsführer-SS Heinrich Himmler complaining about the anti-Semitic and anti-Christian policies of the Nazi regime, asking for the end of the "emergency" laws that had suspended civil rights in Germany since 1933, and called for the end of the NSDAP influence on the judiciary. Predictably enough, the memo drew the attention of the Gestapo, who visited both men at their homes to deliver a "final warning" telling them if they continued with "trouble-making", they would be sent to a concentration camp. In September 1943, Goerdeler appealed to his friend Jacob Wallenberg to ask that the British suspend bombing attacks against Berlin, Stuttgart and Leipzig until the middle of October because "the oppositional movement has its centres there and the interruption of communications would make the putsch more difficult". In a memo Goerdeler sent to the British and American governments in the autumn of 1943, he called for a negotiated peace between the Allies and Germany once the Nazis were overthrown. In the same memo, Goerdeler called for the "1914 frontier" to serve as the basis of Germany's borders both in Western and Eastern Europe, called for Austria and the Sudetenland remaining part of the Reich, and for the annexation of the south Tyrol region of Italy. In the discussions within the German Opposition between the "Easterners" who favoured reaching an understanding with the Soviet Union after the overthrow of Hitler and the "Westerners" who favoured reaching an understanding with Britain and the United States, Goerdeler belonged to the "Westerners", considering Communism to be no different from National Socialism, and regarding the "Easterners" as being dangerously naive about the Soviets.

In the summer of 1943, Goerdeler confidently told Jacob Wallenberg that the putsch to depose Hitler would happen for certain "in September", even through Goerdeler had yet to win over any active-duty senior officers. After five years of trying, the only senior officers Goerdeler had recruited were Field Marshal Erwin von Witzleben, whom Hitler had forced into retirement in early 1942 and General Ludwig Beck who had resigned in 1938. In September 1943, Goerdeler attended a meeting at the home of Olbricht where together with his host Olbricht, General Beck and von Tresckow he finally won over the vacillating Field Marshal Kluge into joining the conspiracy. However, no sooner than Kluge was finally persuaded to join the plot than he was badly injured in a car accident that removed him from active command. As Goerdeler gloomily noted, Kluge's successor, Field Marshal Ernst Busch, was a convinced National Socialist who was clearly not "verschwörungsfähig" (plot-worthy).

In the autumn of 1943, Goerdeler first met Colonel Count Claus von Stauffenberg. The two men took an immediate dislike to each other. Goerdeler wrote that Stauffenberg "revealed himself as a cranky, obstinate fellow who wanted to play politics. I had many a row with him, but greatly esteemed him. He wanted to steer a dubious political course with the left-leaning Socialists and Communists, and gave me a bad time with his overwhelming egotism". Goerdeler, who had been the unofficial leader of the German opposition since 1937, resented the efforts of Stauffenberg, who he regarded as a dangerous "romantic socialist", to take over the conspiracy. Stauffenberg for his part, saw Goerdeler as the leader of "the revolution of the greybeards".

Despite his differences with Stauffenberg, Goerdeler appreciated Stauffenberg for solving a problem that had bedevilled him since 1938. Goerdeler had always assumed that to stage a putsch required recruiting a senior military figure who could order large bodies of troops into action against the Nazi regime, and it had been the unwillingness of senior military officers to be recruited like Kluge, who could never quite make up his mind, or Halder, who had severed relations with Goerdeler in 1940 once he became convinced that Hitler would win the war that had prevented him from staging a putsch. Stauffenberg solved that problem by devising Operation Valkyrie, a plan that ostensibly was meant to crush a slave labour uprising but really was the cover for a putsch that could be activated by officers of less than senior rank. Goerdeler was pleased that at long last, the means for a putsch, without the senior officers who were plainly not willing to break with the regime, had been devised by Stauffenberg, but his uneasy relations with Stauffenberg were described by the German historian Hans Mommsen as one of mutual "misunderstandings".

Unlike the Kreisau Circle, Goerdeler was a strong champion of laissez-faire capitalism, and was very much opposed to what he saw as the socialism of the Kreisau Circle. In Goerdeler's vision, the economic system was to serve as the basis of the "democracy of the Ten Commandments." However, Goerdeler was heavily criticised by other members of the German resistance (for example by some members the Kreisau Circle) for objecting to killing Hitler (Goerdeler wanted to see Hitler tried and had no objection to him being executed after his conviction), for his sympathy for reintroducing monarchy, and for his extremely anticommunist ideology.

In late February 1944, Goerdeler sent Strölin to meet Field Marshal Erwin Rommel to see if he would like to join the anti-Nazi conspiracy and was delighted when Strölin gave him a positive report about Rommel's attitude towards the conspiracy. Goerdeler decided that Rommel would be the ideal person to play a leading role in a post-Hitler government and asked Strölin to find out if Rommel would be willing to play that role. As Rommel was fully engaged in preparations to resist the expected Allied landing in France all through the spring of 1944, it proved difficult for Strölin to make contact again. After meeting Goerdeler in March 1944, Strölin described him in a high-strung state, constantly afraid that he could be arrested at any moment, and anxious to recruit Rommel while attempting to juggle Rommel's demand that he be Wehrmacht Commander-in-Chief with his prior promise that position would go to Erwin von Witzleben if Hitler were overthrown. Not until May could a meeting be arranged to sort out where Rommel stood in regards to the conspiracy. On 27 May 1944 Goerdeler attended a secret meeting with Strölin, the former Foreign Minister Baron Konstantin von Neurath and General Hans Speidel (who was representing Rommel) at Speidel's flat in Freudenstadt. At the meeting, Speidel speaking on behalf of Rommel made clear that his chief wanted nothing to do with any attempt to assassinate Hitler, but was prepared to serve in a government headed by Goerdeler. Later in 1944, Goerdeler told Kunrath von Hammerstein, "In those days your father stood at the helm of world history". Goerdeler meant that if General Kurt von Hammerstein-Equord had carried out a putsch in 1933, the present state of world troubles in 1944 might have been avoided.

=== Views on the "Jewish Question" ===
A latter-day controversy about Goerdeler concerns his attitude towards anti-Semitism. Some historians such as Christof Dipper and Martin Broszat have argued that Goerdeler agreed with the antisemitic policy of the regime until 1938, though afterwards he did resist the Holocaust and other forms of mass murder. The German historian Christof Dipper in his 1983 essay "Der Deutsche Widerstand und die Juden" (translated into English as "The German Resistance and the Jews") argued that the majority of the anti-Nazi national-conservatives such as Goerdeler were anti-Semitic. Dipper wrote that for Goerdeler and his social circle "the bureaucratic, pseudo-legal deprivation of the Jews practised until 1938 was still considered acceptable". Though Dipper noted that no one in the Widerstand movement supported the Holocaust, he claimed also that the national-conservatives like Goerdeler did not intend to restore civil rights to the Jews after the overthrow of Hitler.

By contrast, the Canadian historian Peter Hoffmann in his 2004 essay "The German Resistance and the Holocaust" has contended that Goerdeler was opposed to anti-Semitism in all forms, and that this opposition played a major role in motivating his efforts to overthrow the Nazi regime. Most recently in his 2011 book Carl Goerdeler and the Jewish Question, 1933–1942 and in his 2013 book Carl Goerdeler gegen die Verfolgung der Juden, Hoffmann has defended Goerdeler against the charge that he was an anti-Semite. Hoffmann quotes memoranda for Hitler from the years 1934–1939 in which Goerdeler urged the government to change its "Jewish policy" as a matter of justice and national interests; Goerdeler argued that Germany could enjoy good relations with Britain, France and the United States only if the policies concerning "the Jewish Question, the Free-Masons’ Question, legal security [and] the Church Question" were changed.

Before the war, Goerdeler had implored the British government to pressure Hitler to alleviate his "Jewish policy". In 1941, he proposed for the League of Nations to found a Jewish state that would extend Jewish citizenship to all Jews in the world. Since Germans according to the German citizenship law of 1913 lost their German citizenship by acquiring another citizenship, Goerdeler declared that for German Jews there must be four categories of "exceptions" to this rule. Analysis of population, emigration, immigration and naturalization statistics shows that Goerdeler's proposal guaranteed German citizenship to at least 94% of German Jews and sustain the legal fiction of "exceptions". Goerdeler thus intended to protect, if possible, all German Jews against the loss of their German citizenship; the few who did not fall into one of Goerdeler's categories of "exceptions" could have applied, under the 1913 German citizenship law, for re-instatement. As a leading civilian anti-Hitler conspiracy leader, Goerdeler worked tirelessly to bring about the pre-condition for his proposals' implementation: the overthrow of the Nazi government.

The Israeli historian Danny Orbach in his 2010 book Valkyrie: Hahitnagdut Hagermanit Lehitler (Valkyrie: Germans Against Hitler) defended Goerdeler against the charge that he was an anti-Semite by noting Goerdeler's strong support for Zionism and his work with Chaim Weizmann in encouraging German Jews to move to the British Mandate for Palestine. In a recent article, Orbach also argued that Dipper's accusations of anti-Semitism are based on a misreading, if not distortion, of Goerdeler's memoranda, thus ignoring Goerdeler's plan to restore emancipation to the German Jews and securing a national homeland for their Polish brethren. The Israeli historian Tom Segev has dismissed Orbach's claims that Goerdeler was a philo-Semitic, stating that Goerdeler was an anti-Semitic who supported Zionism only because he disliked the idea of German Jews living in Germany, and he much preferred if they all move to Palestine. The Israeli historian David Bankier wrote in 2002 that Goerdeler was appalled by the Holocaust and was sincerely against the Nazis, but for him, Jews were not and never could be Germans, and instead were an alien, foreign element who would just have to be relocated from Germany whether they liked it or not. Bankier wrote that Goerdeler felt that the "Final Solution to the Jewish Question" was going too far and would have to be stopped, but "[f]or Goerdeler, the solution of the Jewish question after the war was the establishment of a Jewish state in parts of Canada or South America and granting German citizenship only to a small, elitist minority of Jews willing to assimilate completely."

== 20 July Plot ==
In May 1944, Goerdeler revived his idea of 1943 of talking Hitler into resigning as a way of achieving a peaceful end to Nazi Germany. Again, Goerdeler proposed to meet with Hitler, explain to him why his leadership was defective, and hope that Hitler would resign and appoint Goerdeler his successor. Again, it took considerable effort on the part of Goerdeler's friends to talk him out of this plan, which they considered to be as bizarre as it was impractical. The British historian Ian Kershaw commented that Goerdeler's plans to talk Hitler into resigning reflected a certain lack of realism on his part. In June 1944, Goerdeler finished his final Cabinet list. Had the putsch of 20 July 1944 succeeded, the Cabinet that would have taken power included the following:

- President of Germany (Regent-Reichsverweser): Colonel General Ludwig Beck
- State Secretary to the Regent: Ulrich Wilhelm Graf Schwerin von Schwanenfeld
- Chancellor: Goerdeler (DNVP)
- State Secretary to the Chancellor: Count Peter Yorck von Wartenburg
- Vice-Chancellor: Wilhelm Leuschner (SPD)
- Deputy Vice-Chancellor: Jakob Kaiser (Christian Trade Union leader)
- Minister of War: General Friedrich Olbricht
- State Secretary to the Minister of War: Colonel Count Claus von Stauffenberg
- Commander in Chief of the Armed Forces: Field Marshal Erwin von Witzleben
- Commander in Chief of the Army: Colonel General Erich Hoepner
- Minister of the Interior: Julius Leber (SPD)
- Minister of Economics: Dr. Paul Lejeune-Jung (lawyer and economist)
- Minister of Finance: Ewald Loeser (DNVP)
- Minister of Justice: Joseph Wirmer (Zentrum)
- Minister of Education: Eugen Bolz (Zentrum)
- Minister of Agriculture: Andreas Hermes (Zentrum)
- Minister of Reconstruction: Bernhard Letterhaus (Christian Trade Union leader)
- Minister of Information: Theodor Haubach (SPD).

The position of Minister of Foreign Affairs would have gone to either Ulrich von Hassell (former ambassador to Italy) or Count Friedrich Werner von der Schulenburg (former ambassador to the Soviet Union) depending upon whether the Western powers or the Soviet Union signed an armistice with the new German government first. In the radio address Goerdeler planned to deliver once the putsch had triumphed was included the statement "The persecution of the Jews, which has been carried out in the most inhuman, deeply shaming and quite irreparable ways, is to cease."

On 16 July 1944, Goerdeler saw his wife and children for the last time in Leipzig, and then departed for Berlin to prepare for the putsch planned for later that month. In the days preceding the putsch attempt of 20 July 1944, Goerdeler stayed at the home of General Beck in the Berlin suburb of Lichterfelde. Unlike Beck, Goerdeler was very confident of the success of the planned putsch, and in a most optimistic mood. On 17 July 1944, a warrant for Goerdeler's arrest was issued, causing him to go into hiding. Goerdeler spent the day of the putsch hiding out at the estate of his friend, Baron Palombrini, in an anxious and agitated state, listening obsessively to the radio for news of success. Following the failure of the 20 July putsch, the Gestapo searched the room in which Goerdeler had been hiding out in the Anhalter Bahnhof hotel, in which they discovered a vast collection of documents relating to the putsch, such as the text of Goerdeler's planned radio address to the German people as Chancellor. Much to Goerdeler's deep disappointment, it was Army troops led by Major Otto Ernst Remer rather than the SS who crushed the putsch of 20 July, marking the final time Goerdeler's hopes in the Army were to be dashed.

== Capture and execution ==
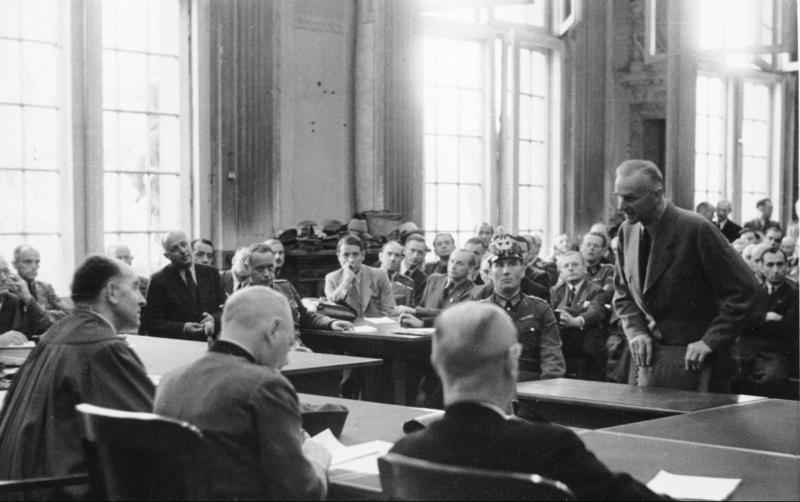
On trial at the People's Court, Roland Freisler presiding at left.

Goerdeler managed to escape from Berlin, but he was apprehended on 12 August 1944 after being denounced by a book-keeper named Helene Schwärzel in Marienwerder (modern Kwidzyn, Poland) while visiting the grave of his parents. After his arrest, eight members of Goerdeler's family were sent to the concentration camps under the Sippenhaft law. His brother, Fritz, was also sentenced to death and executed on 1 March 1945. Under Gestapo interrogation, Goerdeler claimed that the Holocaust was the major reason for his seeking to overthrow the Nazi regime. On 9 September 1944, after a trial at the People's Court, he was sentenced to death. Goerdeler was not physically tortured by the Gestapo, and freely co-operated with them in naming names, which made him the object of considerable hatred from the other prisoners, who saw him as a "spineless rat."

Goerdeler's friend, the historian Gerhard Ritter, who shared the same prison with him, reported that Goerdeler was never tortured but was instead subjected to "the overheating of cells, painfully tight shackling especially at night, bright light shining on one's face while one tried to sleep, completely insufficient food". One prisoner recalled that Goerdeler was often "groaning aloud from hunger". Goerdeler's hope in confessing all was to overload the Gestapo with information, and thereby buy time to save his life and the others imprisoned; in the process, he caused hundreds involved in the plot to be arrested. During his time in prison, Goerdeler was asked by the SS to assist with writing the constitution of a future SS-ruled Germany. Goerdeler agreed, and often met with Otto Ohlendorf and Dr. Mäding of the SD to provide his advice. Whether Goerdeler was sincere in wishing to help the SS or just trying to buy time to save his life remains unclear. When confronted with the loneliness of his imprisonment and the utter defeat of his cause, Goerdeler, who had always been a highly devout Lutheran, became increasingly preoccupied with spiritual matters. Goerdeler was overwhelmed with despair over what he considered to be the triumph of evil and the destruction of all that he loved. Ritter saw Goerdeler in prison in January 1945 and reported:

I was ... astonished at his undiminished intellectual power, but at the same time I was shocked by his outward appearance. It was a man grown old who stood before me, shackled hand and foot, in the same light summer clothes as had on when captured, shabby and collarless, face thin and drawn, strangely different. But it was his eyes that shocked me the most. They were once bright grey eyes and had flashed beneath the heavy eyebrows; that had always been the most impressive thing about him. Now there was no light in them; they were like the eyes of a blind man, yet like nothing I had seen before. His intellectual power was as it had always been; his spiritual strength was not. His natural cheerfulness had gone; his look seemed turned inward. What I beheld was a man with the weariness of death in his soul.

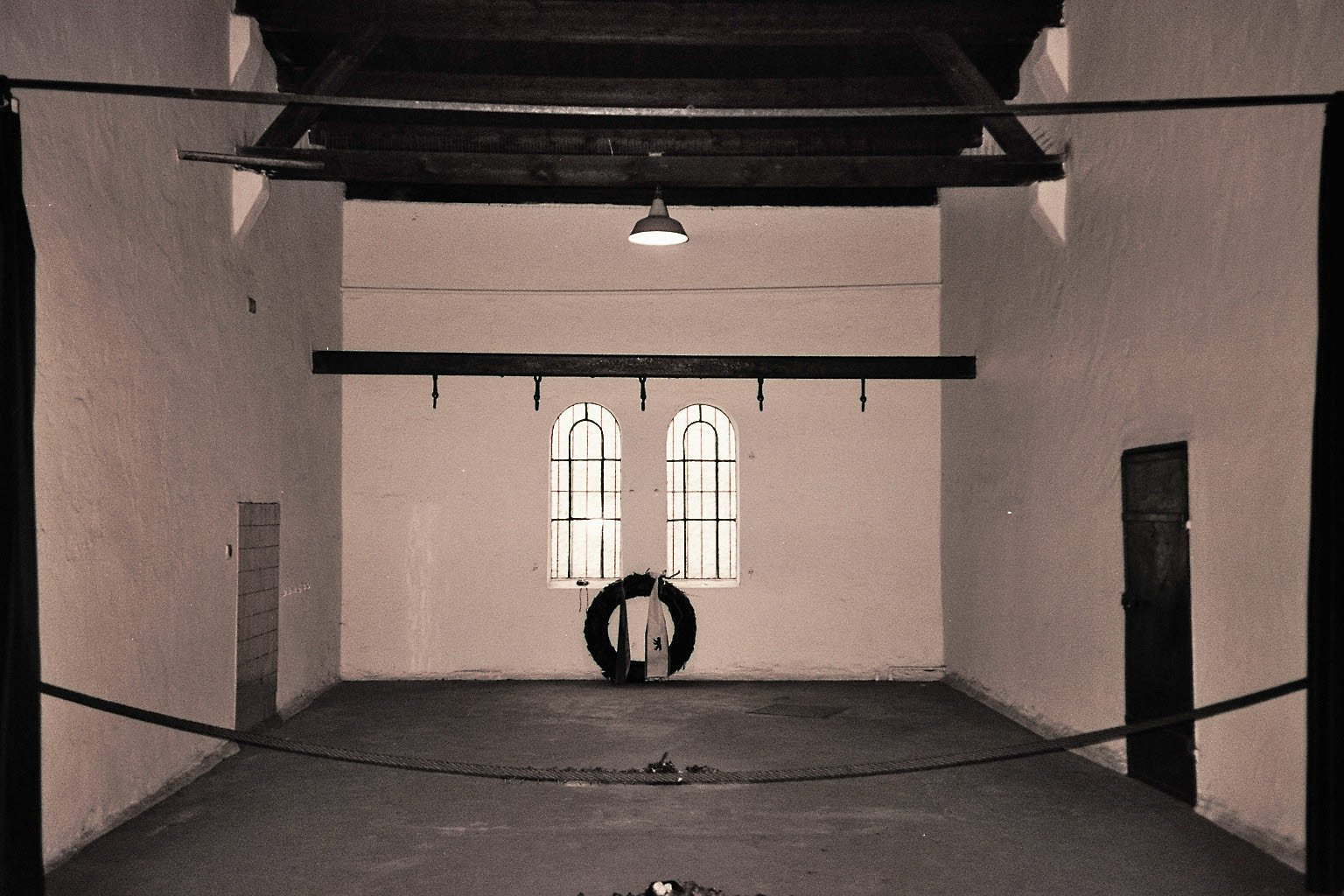
Plötzensee Memorial, 2005

While Goerdeler was on death row, he wrote a letter that called the Holocaust the very worst of Nazi crimes. At the same time, Goerdeler remained anti-Semitic. In his "Thoughts of a Man condemned to Death", written towards the end of 1944 in prison, Goerdeler wrote:

We should not attempt to minimize what has been happening, but we should also emphasize the great guilt of the Jews, who had invaded our public life in ways that lacked customary restraint.

He was finally executed by hanging on 2 February 1945 at Plötzensee Prison in Berlin with two other men: Johannes Popitz and Alfred Delp. While awaiting his death sentence, Goerdeler wrote a farewell letter, which ended with "I ask the world to accept our martyrdom as penance for the German people."

After the war, Helene Schwärzel was arrested for denouncing Goerdeler. In 1946, she was found guilty of crimes against humanity and sentenced to 15 years in prison, which was reduced to 6 years on appeal.
