= Freiburg school =

School of economic thought

The Freiburg school (German: Freiburger Schule) is a school of economic thought founded in the 1930s at the University of Freiburg.

The Freiburg School is closely associated with German economists and legal scholars such as Walter Eucken, Franz Böhm, and Hans Großmann-Doerth. The school developed a theory of economic order centered around fair competition, legal framework, and institutional stability Rather than endorsing pure laissez-faire economics, Freiburg School thinkers maintained the idea that the state should create a framework for fair competition that would prevent monopolies, cartels, and other concentrations of private economic power. Walter Eucken, a leading figure in the school, emphasized that economic policy should maintain a competitive order, rather than directly controlling production. The schools emphasis on structured competition and an "economic constitution" would go on to be a great influence on ordoliberalism and would greatly influence West Germany's post World War II social market economy. West-German policy makers, specifically Ludwig Erhard, used ordoliberalism and The Freiburg School of thought as a basis for Germany's social market economy following the war.

It builds somewhat on the earlier historical school of economics but stresses that only some forms of competition are good, while others may require oversight. This is considered a lawful and legitimate role of government in a democracy in the Freiburg school. The Freiburg school provided the economic theoretical elements of ordoliberalism and the social market economy in post-war Germany.

The Freiburg school of economics was called "neoliberalism" until Anglo-American scholars reappropriated the term.

== Adherents ==
- Franz Böhm
- Juergen B. Donges
- Ludwig Erhard
- Walter Eucken
- Edith Eucken-Erdsiek
- Andreas Freytag
- Hans Gestrich
- Hans Großmann-Doerth
- Paul Hensel
- Michael Hüther
- Wolfgang Kitterer
- Friedrich A. Lutz
- Karl-Friedrich Maier
- Fritz W. Meyer
- Leonhard Miksch
- Bernd Raffelhüschen
- Hans-Werner Sinn

Wilhelm Röpke (from the Austrian school), Alfred Müller-Armack and Alexander Rüstow were not members of the Freiburg school but did provide, together with the Freiburg school, the foundations of ordoliberalism.

== See also ==
- Freiburg Circles
- ORDO (journal)
- Social market economy
- Historical school of economics

== Sources ==
- Nils Goldschmidt (2005). Wirtschaft, Politik und Freiheit: Freiburger Wirtschaftswissenschaftler und der Widerstand. Mohr Siebeck. ISBN 978-3-16-148520-6. p. 315.
- Gabler Verlag (Herausgeber), Gabler Wirtschaftslexikon, Stichwort: Freiburger Schule (online)
- Oswalt, Walter. "Zur Einführung: Walter Eucken (1891–1950)". In Goldschmidt, Nils; Wohlgemuth, Michael (eds.). Grundtexte zur Freiburger Tradition der Ordnungsökonomik (in German). p. 128. ISBN 978-3-16-148297-7.
- Viktor J. Vanberg, “The Freiburg School: Walter Eucken and Ordoliberalism” (Walter Eucken Institut, 2004):
- Hauke Rieter and Matthias Schmolz, “The Ideas of German Ordoliberalism 1938–45: Pointing the Way to a New Economic Order,” The European Journal of the History of Economic Thought 1, no. 1 (1993): 87–114:
- Daniel Nientiedt, “German Ordoliberalism and Value Freedom: The Case of Walter Eucken,” History of Political Economy 54, no. 4 (2022): 785–799:
- Julien Dumont, “The Other Neoliberalism: German Ordoliberalism after the Euro Crisis,” LSE Government Blog, May 29, 2018:
