= Constantin von Dietze =

Agronomist, lawyer, economist, and theologian

Friedrich Carl Nicolaus Constantin von Dietze
- Born: 9 August 1891; Gottesgnaden, German Empire
- Died: 18 March 1973 (aged 81); Freiburg im Breisgau, West Germany
- Education: University of Cambridge; University of Tübingen; University of Halle an der Saale; University of Breslau; University of Berlin; University of Freiburg
- Occupations: Agronomist, Lawyer, Economist, Theologian
- Known for: Opposition to Nazi regime, member of Confessing Church and Freiburg Circle
- Awards: Bundesverdienstkreuz

Friedrich Carl Nicolaus Constantin von Dietze (9 August 1891 – 18 March 1973) was an agronomist, lawyer, economist, and theologian. He was a member of both the Confessing Church and the "Freiburg Circle" during the Nazi era.

== Early life and World War I ==
Friedrich Carl Nicolaus Constantin von Dietze was born in Gottesgnaden, the son of a former Rittmeister, Constantin von Dietze by his marriage to Johanna Gündell. His grandfather, Adolf von Dietze-Barby, was a close friend of Otto von Bismarck and a conservative member of the Prussian House of Representatives.

Dietze attended the Landesschule Pforta and studied law with the intention of someday working either in administration or diplomacy. He attended the universities of Cambridge, Tübingen, and Halle an der Saale. After a year of voluntary military service, Dietze entered World War I as a lieutenant. He was captured by the Russians in 1915 and taken to a detention camp in Siberia, where he learned Russian and began reading economic works. He was released three years later following the Russian Revolution and returned to Germany.

After returning to Germany, Dietze resumed his studies at the University of Breslau, where he received a doctorate in political science in 1919 for his work on Stolypinian land reform.

== Opposition to the Nazis ==
Throughout the 1920s Dietze worked as a professor at the universities of Göttingen, Rostock, and Jena. On 1 April 1933 he left the University of Jena and moved to Berlin as the successor to economist Max Sering at the University of Berlin. During his first year in Berlin, Dietze came in contact with many leading politicians including Hanns Kerrl and Roland Freisler.

Dietze wasted little time establishing himself as an opponent of the Nazi regime, joining the Confessing Church and consistently voicing his disapproval of the policies of Reich Minister of Food Richard Walther Darré. As a result, the Institute for Agricultural and Housing Engineering was closed by the Nazis in 1934.

As President of the Verein für Socialpolitik, Dietze acted directly against the Nazi Regime by granting a Jewish doctoral candidate his doctorate in 1935 (Rubin Kellman i.e. Reuven Avineri. Submitted 27 June 1935, approved May 6, 1936). He protected him from being expelled from the university until the end of his doctorate.

After moving to Freiburg im Breisgau in 1936 to replace Karl Diehl at the University of Freiburg, Dietze became increasingly active in the Confessing Church's opposition to the Nazis. He was arrested and held in captivity by the Gestapo for two weeks in 1937 after a conflict with the "German Christians" in which he informed visitors attending the church of the arrest of the Confessing Church's pastor and subsequent replacement with a pastor for the "German Christians."

In 1938 Dietze worked with Adolf Lampe and Walter Eucken to found the Arbeitsgemeinschaft Erwin von Beckerath, which would later become the Freiburger Kreis. Through this group Dietze would come into direct contact with Carl Friedrich Goerdeler and Dietrich Bonhoeffer.

After the failure of the 20 July Plot, Dietze was arrested for his relationship with Goerdeler and Bonhoeffer and was charged with high treason. He was imprisoned in Ravensbrück concentration camp and at Zellengefängnis Lehrter Straße 3 in Berlin. His impending conviction and death sentence were impeded only by the collapse of the Third Reich, making him one of the few political prisoners who avoided being executed in the Plötzensee Prison.

== Post-war ==
After returning to Freiburg on 17 June 1945, Dietze resumed teaching at the university and served as its Rector from 1946 until 1949. During this time he founded a research establishment for agricultural politics and sociology, of which he was the president until his death.

In 1948 Dietze received an honorary doctorate in Theology from the University of Heidelberg for his commitment to Christian lifestyle and ethics in the field of economics. He became a member of the advisory council to the Federal Ministry of Food, Agriculture and Consumer Protection in 1950 and served as president of the Evangelical Church in Germany from 1955 until 1961.

In 1958 and 1961 he was awarded a Bundesverdienstkreuz.

In 1960 Dietze was appointed a Doctor of Agriculture by the agricultural faculty at the University of Bonn.

Dietze died on 18 March 1973 at the age of 81 in Freiburg im Breisgau.
