= Ordoliberalism =

German political philosophy

Ordoliberalism is the German variant of economic liberalism that emphasizes the need for government to ensure that the free market produces results close to its theoretical potential.

Ordoliberal ideals became the foundation of the creation of the post-World War II German social market economy and its attendant Wirtschaftswunder. The term "ordoliberalism" (German: Ordoliberalismus) was coined in 1950 by Hero Moeller and refers to the academic journal ORDO.

== Linguistic differentiation ==
Ordoliberals separate themselves from classical liberals. Notably, Walter Eucken, with Franz Böhm, founder of ordoliberalism and the Freiburg School, rejected neoliberalism.

Ordoliberals promote the concept of the social market economy, which favors a strong role for the state with respect to the market and which is in many ways different from the ideas connected to the term "neoliberalism". The term "neoliberalism" was originally coined in 1938 at the Colloque Walter Lippmann by Alexander Rüstow, who is regarded as an ordoliberal today.

Because of the connected history, ordoliberalism is sometimes referred to as "German neoliberalism". This has led to frequent confusion and mix-ups of terms and ideas in the discourse, debate and criticism of both economic schools. In 1991, political economist Michel Albert published Capitalisme Contre Capitalisme, and in 2001 Peter A. Hall and David Soskice published Varieties of Capitalism, and both separated the concepts and developed the new terms "liberal market economy" and "coordinated market economy" to distinguish neoliberalism and ordoliberalism.

== Development ==
The theory was developed from about 1930 to 1950 by German economists and legal scholars from the Freiburg School, such as Walter Eucken, Franz Böhm, Hans Grossmann-Doerth, and Leonhard Miksch.

Ordoliberal ideals (with modifications) drove the creation of the post-World War II German social market economy. They were especially influential in forming a firm competition law in Germany. However, the social market economy was implemented in economies where corporatism was already well established, so ordoliberal ideals were not as far-reaching as the theory's economic founders had intended.

Since the 1960s, ordoliberal influence on economics and jurisprudence has significantly diminished; however, many German economists define themselves as ordoliberals through the present day, the ORDO is still published, and the Faculty of Economics at the University of Freiburg is still teaching ordoliberalism. Additionally, some institutes and foundations such as the Walter Eucken Institut and the Stiftung Ordnungspolitik are engaged in the ordoliberal tradition.

Germany's Free Democratic Party (FDP) is a traditional and committed supporter of ordoliberalism, the party having been influenced by the economic theories of Wilhelm Röpke and Alexander Rüstow. Historical FDP party grandee Otto Graf Lambsdorff, who served as Federal Minister of Economics, was a particular proponent of ordoliberalism.

== Implementation ==
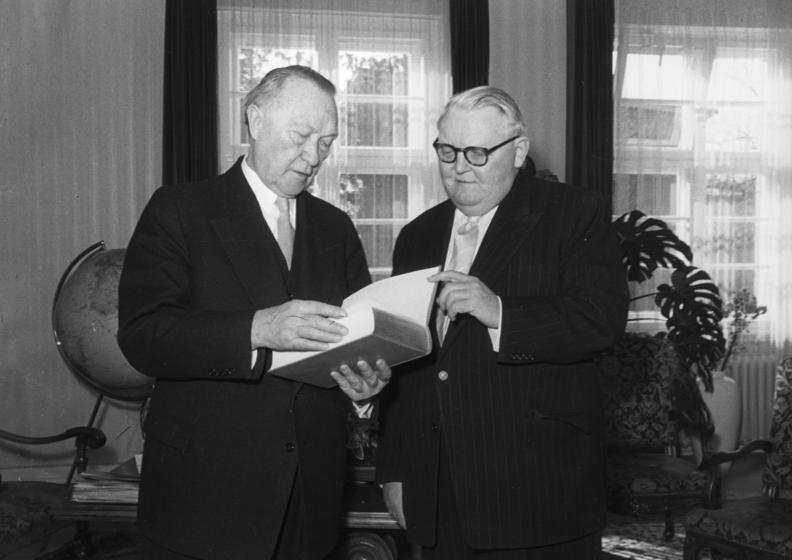
Ludwig Erhard (right) with Konrad Adenauer in 1956, while Erhard was Minister of Economics

Ordoliberalism was a major influence on the economic model developed in post-war West Germany. Ordoliberalism in Germany became known as the social market economy.

The Ordoliberal model implemented in Germany was started under the government administration of Konrad Adenauer. His government's Minister of Economics, Ludwig Erhard, was a known Ordoliberal and adherent of the Freiburg School. Under Adenauer, some, but not all, price controls were lifted, and taxes on small businesses and corporations were lowered. Furthermore, social security and pensions were increased to provide a social base income. Ordoliberals have stated that these policies led to the Wirtschaftswunder, or economic miracle.

== Theory ==
Ordoliberal theory holds that the state must create a proper legal environment for the economy and maintain a healthy level of competition through measures that adhere to market principles. This is the foundation of its legitimacy. The concern is that, if the state does not take active measures to foster competition, firms with monopoly (or oligopoly) power will emerge, which will not only subvert the advantages offered by the market economy, but also possibly undermine good government, since strong economic power can be transformed into political power.

According to Stephen Padgett, "a central tenet of ordo-liberalism is a clearly defined division of labor in economic management, with specific responsibilities assigned to particular institutions. Monetary policy should be the responsibility of a central bank committed to monetary stability and low inflation, and insulated from political pressure by independent status. Fiscal policy—balancing tax revenue against government expenditure—is the domain of the government, whilst macro-economic policy is the preserve of employers and trade unions." The state should form an economic order instead of directing economic processes, and three negative examples ordoliberals used to back their theories were Nazism, Keynesianism, and Soviet socialism. It is also seen as a third way between collectivism and laissez-faire liberalism.

While the ordoliberal idea of a social market is similar to that of the third-way social democracy advocated since the 1990s by the likes of the New Labour government (especially during the premiership of Tony Blair), there are a few key differences. Whilst they both adhere to the idea of providing a moderate stance between socialism and capitalism, the ordoliberal social market model often combines private enterprise with government regulation to establish fair competition (although German network industries are known to have been deregulated), whereas advocates of the third-way social democracy model have been known to oversee multiple economic deregulations. The third way social democracy model has also foreseen a clash of ideas regarding the establishment of the welfare state, in comparison to the ordoliberal's idea of a social market model being open to the benefits of social welfare.

Ordoliberals are also known for pursuing a minimum configuration of vital resources and progressive taxation. The ordoliberal emphasis on the privatization of public services and other public firms such as telecommunication services; wealth redistribution and minimum wage laws as regulative principles makes clear the links between this economic model and the social market economy.

Wilhelm Röpke considered ordoliberalism to be "liberal conservatism", against capitalism in his work Civitas Humana ("A Humane Order of Society", 1944). Alexander Rüstow also criticized laissez-faire capitalism in his work Das Versagen des Wirtschaftsliberalismus ("The Failure of Economic Liberalism", 1950). The ordoliberals thus separated themselves from classical liberals and valued the idea of social justice. "Social security and social justice", wrote Eucken, "are the greatest concerns of our time".

Michel Foucault also notes the similarity (beyond just historical contemporaneity) between the Ordo/Freiburg school and the Frankfurt School of critical theory, due to their inheritance from Max Weber. That is, both recognise the "irrational rationality" of the capitalist system, but not the "logic of contradiction" that Marx posited. Both groups took up the same problem, but in vastly different directions. The political philosophy of Ordoliberals was influenced by Aristotle, de Tocqueville, Hegel, Spengler, Mannheim, Weber, and Husserl.

== Criticism ==
According to Sebastian Dullien and Ulrike Guérot, ordoliberalism is central to the German approach to the European sovereign-debt crisis, which has often led to conflicts with other European countries.

== See also ==
- Allocative efficiency
- Christian democracy
- Dirigisme
- Freiburg School
- Liberal conservatism
- Neoliberalism
- Radical centrism
- Social market economy
