= Freiburg Circles =

Academic group concerned with neoliberalism and opposition to Nazism, in 1930s Germany

The Freiburg Circles were a school of economic thought founded in the 1930s in Germany.

== History ==
The Circles subsumed three initially religiously motivated working groups whose memberships overlapped, namely the Freiburger Konzil, the Bonhoeffer Kreis, and the Arbeitsgemeinschaft Erwin von Beckerath, that arguably provided the platform for the renaissance of liberal political and economic thinking in post-war Germany. In particular the latter working group, presided over by Erwin von Beckerath, as a private continuation of the former Arbeitsgemeinschaft Volkswirtschaftslehre (Working Committee of Political Economy), which was established within the Akademie für Deutsches Recht (Academy for German Law) in 1940, but suspended on 1 March 1943, was concerned with the transformation of a wartime economy into a peacetime one and finding an order to govern it.

At the first meeting in Freiburg im Breisgau on 21 March 1943, the eponym of the consortium, Erwin von Beckerath, invited the economists Constantin von Dietze, Walter Eucken, Adolf Lampe, and Clemens Bauer from the University of Freiburg, Jens Jessen and Heinrich von Stackelberg from the University of Berlin, Günter Schmölders and Theodor Wessels from Cologne University, as well as Erich Preiser and the jurist Franz Böhm from the University of Jena. For further meetings, the former chief editor of the Industrie- und Handelszeitung, Hans Gestrich, received invitations; he unexpectedly died in November 1943. Additionally, the social policy specialist at University of Marburg, Gerhard Albrecht, and the editor of the business section of the Kölnische Zeitung, Fritz Hauenstein, joined the working group pursuing a new liberal and social economic order.

== Ideology ==
In the context of the rehabilitation of classical economics in the face of the Nazis’ plans for an autarkic economic system, but even more due to its submitting reports directly to the political leader of the anti-Hitler resistance, Carl Friedrich Goerdeler, the Arbeitsgemeinschaft Erwin von Beckerath has predominantly been viewed as an opposition circle to National Socialism. The group’s advocacy of a neo-liberal economic policy also accounts for the conceptual development of the Social Market Economy.

According to the economists around Erwin von Beckerath, the economic and socio-political reconstruction of post-war Germany could be achieved only by the reinstatement of a market economy fostering individual freedom and entrepreneurship. However, the predominant thinking was that a certain form of planning was necessary for a transitional period following the war; and so the Befehlswirtschaft (Command Economy) of the Third Reich and a free market economy were both excluded from consideration. Taking into account the conflicting claims of personal freedom and social orientation in times of pressing economic needs, the concept of mittelbare Wirtschaftssteuerung (Indirect Economic Control) was proposed. This supposed market-compatible government practice, i.e. any stimulation or interference should not eliminate the proper functioning of market forces, was embodied by a so-called ‘marktliche Wirtschaftsordnung’ (Market Economic Order).

== See also ==
- Freiburg school
