= Walter Eucken =

German economist (1891–1950)

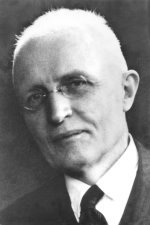
- Portrait of Eucken
- Born: 17 January 1891; Jena, Saxe-Weimar-Eisenach, German Empire
- Died: 20 March 1950 (aged 59); London, England

Academic background
- Education: University of Kiel, University of Bonn, University of Jena

Academic work
- Discipline: Macroeconomics
- School or tradition: Freiburg school
- Institutions: University of Freiburg, University of Tübingen
- Doctoral students: Friedrich Lutz; Martin J. Beckmann; Wilhelm Krelle
- Notable ideas: Ordoliberalism

Walter Eucken (German: [ˈɔʏkn̩]; 17 January 1891 – 20 March 1950) was a German economist of the Freiburg school and father of ordoliberalism. Ordoliberalism was based on the concept of social market economy balancing free markets with regulatory oversight. The Walter Eucken Institut was founded four years after his death and his ideas influenced West Germany’s economic policy.

== Early life and education ==
Walter Eucken was born on 17 January 1891 in Jena in the German state of Saxe-Weimar-Eisenach (present-day Thuringia), a son of the philosopher Rudolf Eucken, and his wife, Irene née Passow (1863–1941), a painter.

Walter grew up in an intellectually stimulating environment. His father was one of the most influential philosophers of the German Empire and the winner of the 1908 Nobel Prize in Literature. Eucken's father read Aristotle with his sons in the original Greek. Visitors to the family villa included Stefan George, Hugo von Hofmannsthal, Ernst Ludwig Kirchner, Edvard Munch and Ferdinand Hodler.

Walter had one sister and one brother, the chemist/physicist Arnold Eucken.

Walter Eucken studied economics in Kiel, Bonn and Jena and was awarded his doctorate at Bonn in 1914 (thesis: Verbandsbildung in der Seeschifffahrt). He served as an officer in World War I on both the western and eastern fronts.

== Career ==
After the war ended, Eucken went to Berlin University where he became a full professor in 1921 (thesis: Die Stickstoffversorgung der Welt).

=== Weimar Republic ===
Like most in his family, Eucken was a conservative nationalist and mistrusted the new republic. His mother and sister were active in the German National People's Party (DNVP). Eucken joined the party, but left after one year, although he remained close to it.

Eucken was also associated with the movement later known as Conservative Revolutionary movement. Eventually, he came to distance himself from the conservative movement, mainly because he disagreed with its economic policies. The movement favoured protectionism and trade restrictions, special treatment for large landowners and big industries, a nationalist idea of cooperation between workers and employers, and a positive view of cartels.

In 1925, Eucken began working at the University of Tübingen and, in 1927, he moved to the University of Freiburg where he remained for the rest of his life.

=== Ordoliberalism ===
Eucken's ordoliberalism, which is a special German variant of neoliberalism, argues that the state has the task to provide the political framework for economic freedom to flourish. In contrast to laissez-faire, which by the 1930s had been observed to give rise to cartels and an undue concentration of power, ordoliberalism aims to put limits on the economic power of individuals, companies and associations. This is achieved through a legal and institutional framework, including maintenance of private property, enforcement of private contracts, liability, free entry to markets, and monetary stabilization. In this framework, unlike with a centrally planned economy, Eucken posited that the state should refrain from directing or intervening in the daily economic machinations, but rather maintain a competitive regulatory framework in which economic actors can operate without frequent state intervention.

The idea of ordoliberalism was introduced for the first time in 1937 in Ordnung der Wirtschaft (Economic Order), a periodical published by Walter Eucken, Franz Böhm and Hans Großmann-Doerth. From 1948, it was further developed in the journal ORDO.

=== Nazi Germany ===
During the Nazi era, Martin Heidegger became rector of Freiburg University, imposing the regime's policies persecuting Jews in academia. Eucken was vocal in his opposition of these policies in the university senate. As a result, some of his lectures in the 1930s were protested by the local Nazi student association.

After the Kristallnacht pogrom in 1938, Eucken was one of several Freiburg academics who banded together with several local priests to form a society, where they debated the obligation of Christians to fight against tyranny. The Freiburg Circles had links to Dietrich Bonhoeffer and Carl Friedrich Goerdeler, key figures of the resistance against Hitler.

Bonhoeffer asked Eucken, Adolf Lampe and Constantin von Dietze to draft an appendix to a secret memorandum, in which they formuated a post-war economic and social order, in which the central planning system of the Nazis was to be replaced with a liberal competitive system. If the 20 July 1944 plot to assassinate Hilter had succeeded, these plans would have become the basis of a new economic order.

After the coup failed, Lampe and von Dietze were arrested and tortured by the Gestapo. Eucken, too, was arrested and interrogated twice but released. Two of his friends were executed.

==== Post-World War II era ====
In the aftermath of World War II, Eucken's theories influenced the reforms that set the stage for the reconstruction (or Wirtschaftswunder) of West Germany. As a member of the advisory council to Ludwig Erhard, then economic director of the American-British zone of occupation, Eucken helped in rebuilding West Germany's economic system.

Eucken attended the founding conference of the Mont Pelerin Society and was elected one of the vice-presidents. One of Eucken's students, Leonhard Miksch was the author of the law that abruptly abolished price controls (Leitsätzegesetz) in June 1948.

== Personal life ==
Eucken married the writer and philosopher, Edith Erdsiek (b. 1896), in Berlin in 1920. The couple had two daughters and one son.

== Death and legacy ==
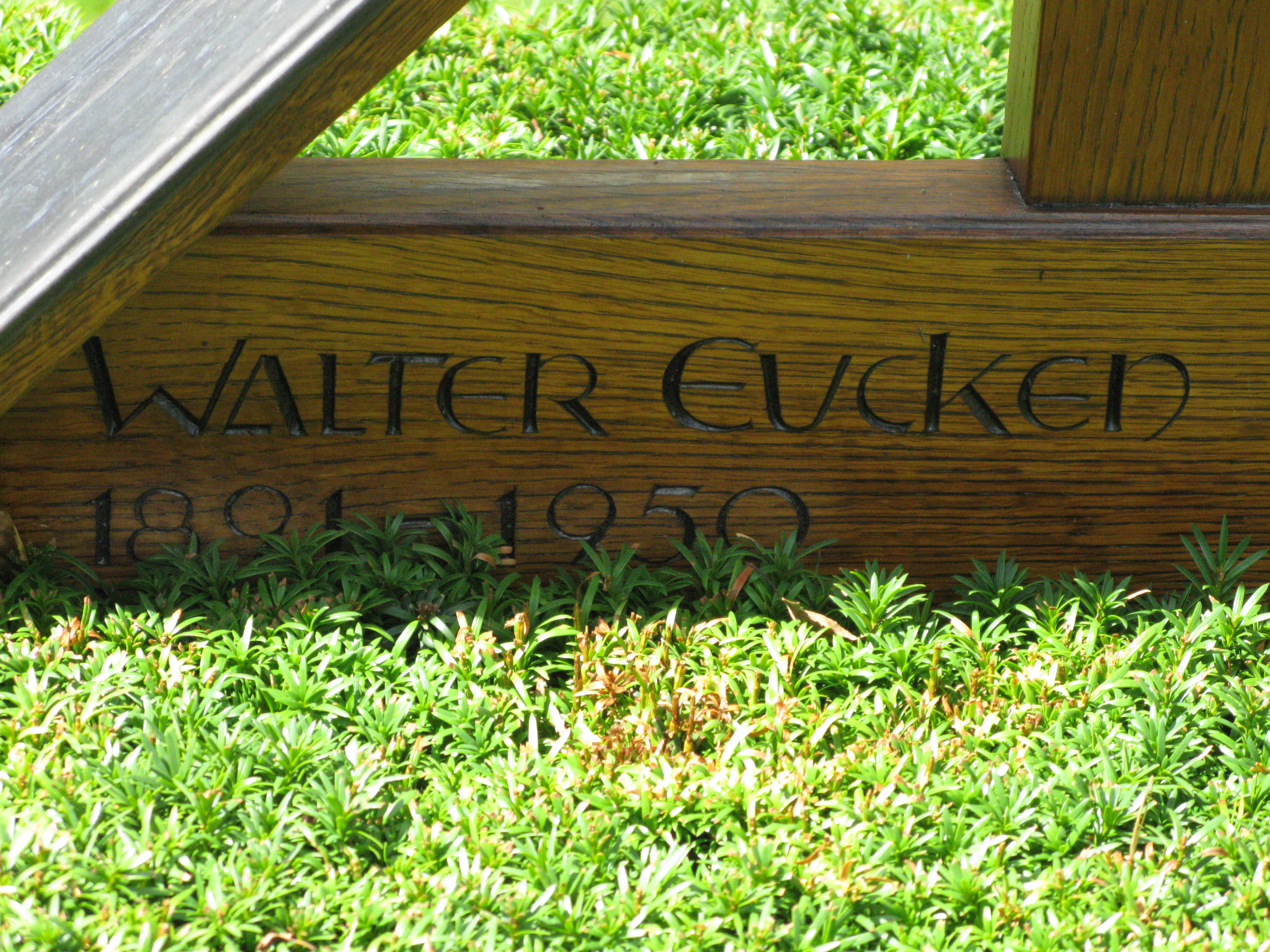
Grave of Eucken

Eucken died of a heart attack on 20 March 1950 during a lecture series at the London School of Economics.

The thinktank, the Walter Eucken Institut, was founded four years after his death in Frieberg. Eucken's ideas were later promoted by his friend, the German politician and economist, Franz Böhm, and found their way into the 1957 German anti-trust law, Act Against Restraints of Competition, the foundation of West-German competition policy.

Eucken papers were initially held by the Walter Eucken Archive in Frankfurt and later moved to the Thuringian State and University Library.

== Works ==
- Kritische Betrachtungen zum deutschen Geldproblem, 1923
- "Nationalökonomie wozu?", in: Wissenschaft und Zeitgeist 10, 1938/1949
- Die Grundlagen der Nationalökonomie, 1939/1950 - Eucken, Walter (1950). The Foundations of Economics. Translated by Hutchinson, Terence Wilmot. London: William Hodge and Company – via Internet Archive.
- "Wettbewerb als Grundprinzip der Wirtschaftsverfassung", in: Schmölders, G., ed., Der Wettbewerb als Mittel volkswirtschaftlicher Leistungssteigerung und Leistungsauslese (Berlin: Duncker & Humblot, 1942)
- "Die Soziale Frage", in: Salin, E., ed., Synopsis, Festgabe für A. Weber (Heidelberg: Lambert Schneider, 1948)
- "Die Wettbewerbsordnung und ihre Verwirklichung", in: Ordo 2, 1949
- "Technik. Konzentration und Ordnung der Wirtschaft", in: Ordo 3, 1950
- Unser Zeitalter der Mißerfolge, 1951
- Kapitaltheoretische Untersuchungen, 1934/1954 (as editor)
- Grundsätze der Wirtschaftspolitik (Principles of Economic Policy), 1952
