= Lutz =

Lutz is a surname and given name, occasionally a short form of Ludwig and Ludger. People with the name include:

== Surname ==
- Adolfo Lutz (1855–1940), Brazilian physician
- Aleda E. Lutz (1915–1944), American Army flight nurse
- Alois Lutz, Austrian figure skater, for whom the Lutz jump is named
- Anke Lutz (born 1970), German chess master
- Anne Mae Lutz (1871–1938), American cytogeneticist
- Berta Lutz (1894–1976), Brazilian scientist and feminist
- Bob Lutz (American football), American high school football coach
- Bob Lutz (businessman) (born 1932), Swiss American V.P. of General Motors
- Bob Lutz (tennis) (born 1947), American tennis player
- Bobby Lutz (basketball) (born 1958), American college basketball coach
- Brenda Lutz, Scottish-American political science writer
- Carl Lutz (1895–1975), Swiss vice-consul to Hungary during WWII, credited with saving over 62,000 Jews
- Chris Lutz, (born 1985), American-Filipino professional basketball player
- Christopher Lutz (born 1971), German chess grandmaster
- Eduard von Lutz, (1810–1893), Bavarian Major General and War Minister
- Edwin George Lutz, American illustrator and author
- Élisabeth Lutz (1914–2008), French mathematician
- Elvira Lutz (born 1935), Uruguayan midwife, educator, and writer
- Erwin Lutz, Austrian prison chef, who protected Jews in WWII
- Frank Eugene Lutz (1879–1943), American entomologist
- Friedel Lutz (1939–2023), German football player
- Friedrich Lutz (1852–1918), Bavarian politician
- Friedrich A. Lutz (1901–1975), German economist
- Gabrielle Lutz (1935–2011), French Olympic sprint canoeist
- Gary Lutz, American writer of poetry and fiction
- George Lutz and Kathy Lutz, basis for the family depicted in The Amityville Horror
- Giles A. Lutz (1910–1982), American author of Western novels
- Gizella Lutz (1906–1992), Hungarian wife of Ferenc Szálasi
- Hans Lutz (born 1949), German track and road cyclist
- Hartmut Lutz (born 1945), German professor of Canadian and American Studies
- Hermann Lutz (1881–1965), German civil servant and social science writer
- Jack Lutz, American computer scientist and mathematician, married to Robyn
- Jarka Lutz, Czechoslovak-French slalom canoeist
- Jean Baptiste Lutz (born 1988), French sprint canoeist
- Jo Lutz (born 1980), Australian rower
- John Lutz (born 1973), American television writer and actor
  - J. D. Lutz, a fictionalized version of this person on 30 Rock
- John Lutz (mystery writer) (1939–2021), American author of mystery novels
- Joe Lutz (1925–2008), American professional baseball player and coach
- Joseph Lutz (general) (1933–1999), American major general
- Joseph Lutz (politician) (born 1948), American politician
- Julie Lutz, American astronomer
- Karen McCullah Lutz, American screenwriter and novelist
- Kellan Lutz (born 1985), American actor
- Ken Lutz (born 1965), American football player
- Larry Lutz (1913–1998), American football player and coach
- Mark Lutz (actor) (born 1970), American actor
- Mark Lutz (athlete) (born 1951), American sprinter
- Mark A. Lutz (born 1941), Swiss-born economics professor
- Martin Lutz (born 1950), German conductor
- Matilda Lutz (born 1991), Italian actress
- Matt Lutz (born 1978), American actor
- Meyer Lutz (1829–1903), German composer of musicals
- Oswald Lutz (1876–1944), first German tank general
- Philip Lutz, Jr. (1888–1947), American politician
- Quirin Lutz (born 2005), Swiss para-cyclist
- Raymond Lutz (born 1957), American businessman, electronics engineer and politician
- Rudolf Lutz (born 1951), Swiss harpsichordist and conductor
- Robyn Lutz, American computer scientist, married to Jack
- Russell Lutz (born 1968), American science fiction author
- Ton Lutz, (1919–2009), Dutch actor
- Vera Lutz (1912–1976), British economist
- Wil Lutz (born 1994), American football placekicker
- William D. Lutz (born 1940), American linguist
- Winifred Ann Lutz (born 1942), American sculptor and fiber artist
- Zach Lutz (born 1986), American professional baseball player

== First name or nickname ==
- Lutz Altepost (born 1981), German flatwater canoeist
- Lutz Bacher (1943–2019), pseudonym of an American artist in a variety of media
- Lutz Brinkmann (born 1975), German politician
- Lutz Dombrowski (born 1959), German long jumper
- Lutz Eigendorf (1956–1983), German footballer and defector
- Lutz Fleischer (1956–2019), German painter and graphic artist
- Lutz Gerresheim (1958–1980), German footballer
- Lutz Glandien (born 1954), German classical and electroacoustic composer and musician
- Lutz Goepel (born 1942), German politician
- Lutz Hachmeister (1959–2024), German media historian, filmmaker and journalist
- Lutz Heck, Ludwig George Heinrich Heck, (1892–1983), German zoologist
- Lutz Heilmann (born 1966), German left-wing politician
- Lutz Heßlich (born 1959), German racing cyclist
- Lutz Hoffmann (1959–1997), German Olympic gymnast
- Lutz Jacobi (born 1955), Dutch politician
- Lutz Jäncke (born 1957), neuropsychologist
- Lutz Kayser, German aerospace engineer, founded OTRAG
- Lutz Kleveman (born 1974), German author, journalist and photographer
- Lutz Körner, German slalom canoeist
- Lutz Kühnlenz, German luger
- Lutz Langer, German Paralympic shot putter
- Lutz Lindemann (born 1949), German football coach and former player
- Lutz Liwowski (born 1967), German sprint canoeist
- Lutz Long (1913–1943), German Olympic long jumper
- Lutz Mack (born 1952), German Olympic gymnast
- Lutz Meyer-Goßner (born 1936), German jurist and law professor
- Lutz Mommartz (1934–2025), German filmmaker
- Lutz Pfannenstiel (born 1973), German football goalkeeper
- Lutz Philipp (1940–2012), German Olympic long-distance runner
- Lutz Rathenow (born 1952), German dissident writer and poet
- Lutz Roeder, software engineer, author of .NET Reflector
- Lutz D. Schmadel (1942–2016), German astronomer
- Lutz Schülbe (born 1961), German footballer
- Lutz Graf Schwerin von Krosigk (1887–1977), German politician
- Lutz Seiler (born 1963), German poet and novelist
- Lutz Taufer, German activist with links to the Socialist Patients' Collective (SPK)
- Lutz Templin (1901–1973), German jazz bandleader
- Lutz Ulbricht (1942–2022), German Olympic rower
- Lutz Unger (born 1951), German Olympic swimmer
- Lutz Wahl (1869–1928), American major general
- Lutz Wanja (born 1956), German Olympic backstroke swimmer
- Lutz Wienhold (born 1965), German footballer
- Lutz Winde (born 1966), German actor and director
- Lutz Wingert (born 1958), German philosopher

== Fictional characters ==
- Lutz, a character from the 2023 Pixar film Elemental
- Lutz Beilschmidt, also known as 2p!Germany, from the alternate universe 2p!Hetalia which is from the 2009 anime Hetalia
