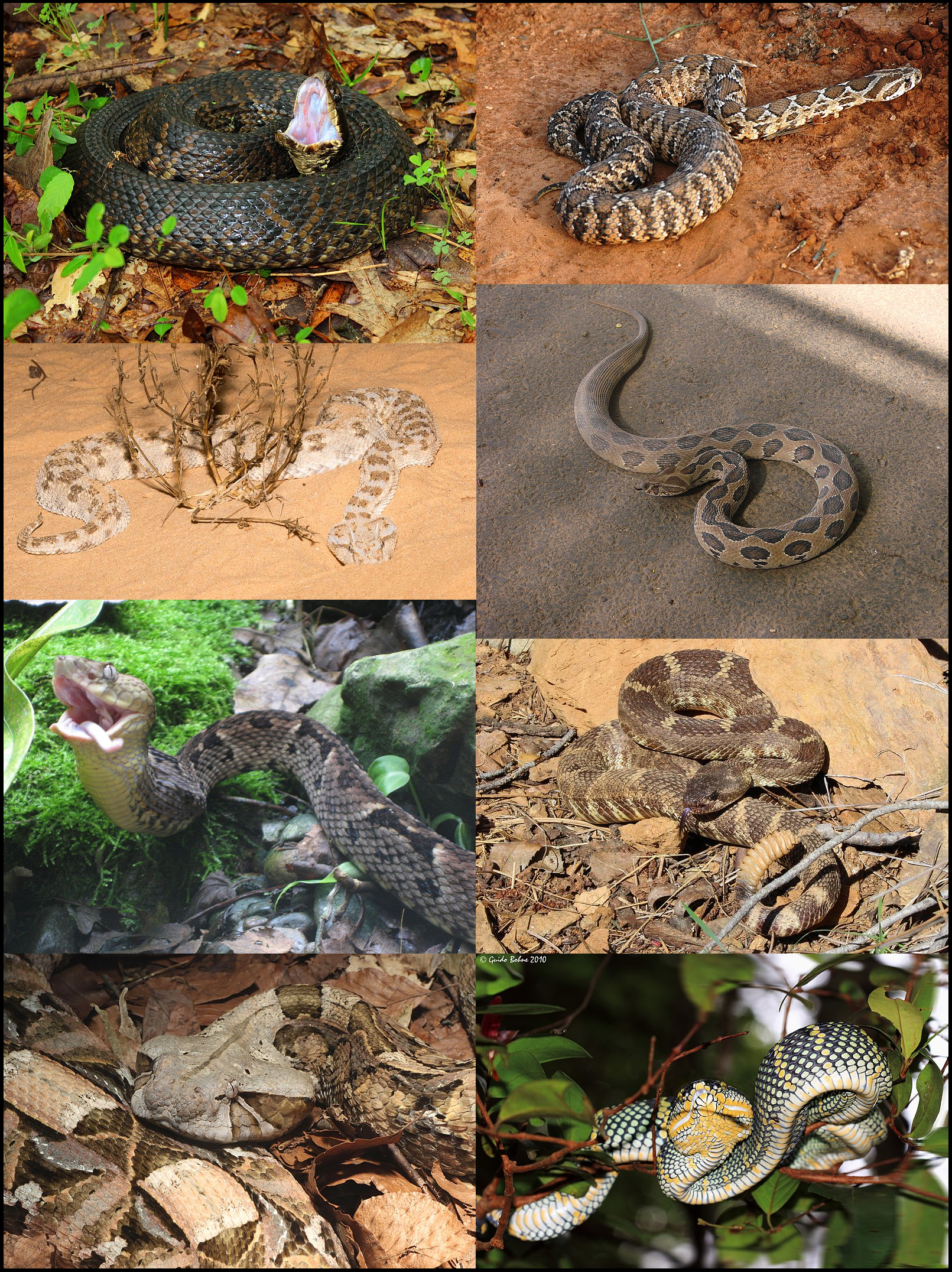

Scientific classification
- Kingdom: Animalia
- Phylum: Chordata
- Class: Reptilia
- Order: Squamata
- Suborder: Serpentes
- Clade: Colubroides
- Family: Viperidae; Oppel, 1811
- Viperidae distribution

Synonyms
- Viperae Laurenti, 1768; Viperini Oppel, 1811; Viperidae Gray, 1825

= Viper =

Viper Temporal range: 47–0 Ma Eocene–Present

Family of snakes

Vipers (/ˈvaɪpər/ VEYE-pər) are snakes in the family Viperidae (/vaɪˈpɛrɪdeɪ/ veye-PERR-ih-day), found in most parts of the world, except for Antarctica, Australia, Hawaii, Madagascar, Ireland, and various other isolated islands. All vipers are venomous, and have long (relative to non-vipers), hinged fangs that permit deep envenomation of their prey. Three subfamilies are currently recognized. They are also known as viperids. The name "viper" is derived from the Latin word vipera, -ae, also meaning viper, possibly from vivus ("living") and parere ("to beget"), referring to the trait viviparity (giving live birth) common in vipers like most of the species of Boidae. The earliest known vipers are believed to have diverged from the rest of the clade Caenophidia in the early Eocene.

== Description ==
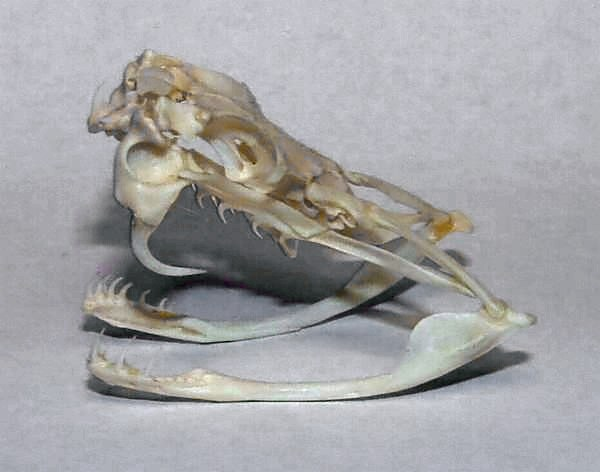
A rattlesnake skull, showing the long fangs used to inject venom

All viperids have a pair of relatively long solenoglyphous (hollow) fangs that are used to inject venom from glands located towards the rear of the upper jaws, just behind the eyes. Each of the two fangs is at the front of the mouth on a short maxillary bone that can rotate back and forth. When not in use, the fangs fold back against the roof of the mouth and are enclosed in a membranous sheath. This rotating mechanism allows for very long fangs to be contained in a relatively small mouth. The left and right fangs can be rotated together or independently. During a strike, the mouth can open nearly 180° and the maxilla rotates forward, erecting the fangs as late as possible so that the fangs do not become damaged, as they are brittle. The jaws close upon impact and the muscular sheaths encapsulating the venom glands contract, injecting the venom as the fangs penetrate the target. This action is very fast; in defensive strikes, it will be more a stab than a bite. Viperids use this mechanism primarily for immobilization and digestion of prey. Pre-digestion occurs as the venom contains proteases, which degrade tissues. Secondarily, it is used for self defense, though in cases with nonprey, such as humans, they may give a dry bite (not inject any venom). A dry bite allows the snake to conserve its precious reserve of venom, because once it has been depleted, time is needed to replenish it, leaving the snake vulnerable. In addition to being able to deliver dry bites, vipers can inject larger quantities of venom into larger prey targets, and smaller amounts into small prey. This causes the ideal amount of predigestion for the lowest amount of venom.

Almost all vipers have keeled scales, a stocky build with a short tail, and a triangle-shaped head distinct from the neck, owing to the location of the venom glands. The great majority have vertically elliptical, or slit-shaped, pupils that can open wide to cover most of the eye or close almost completely, which helps them to see in a wide range of light levels. Typically, vipers are nocturnal and ambush their prey.

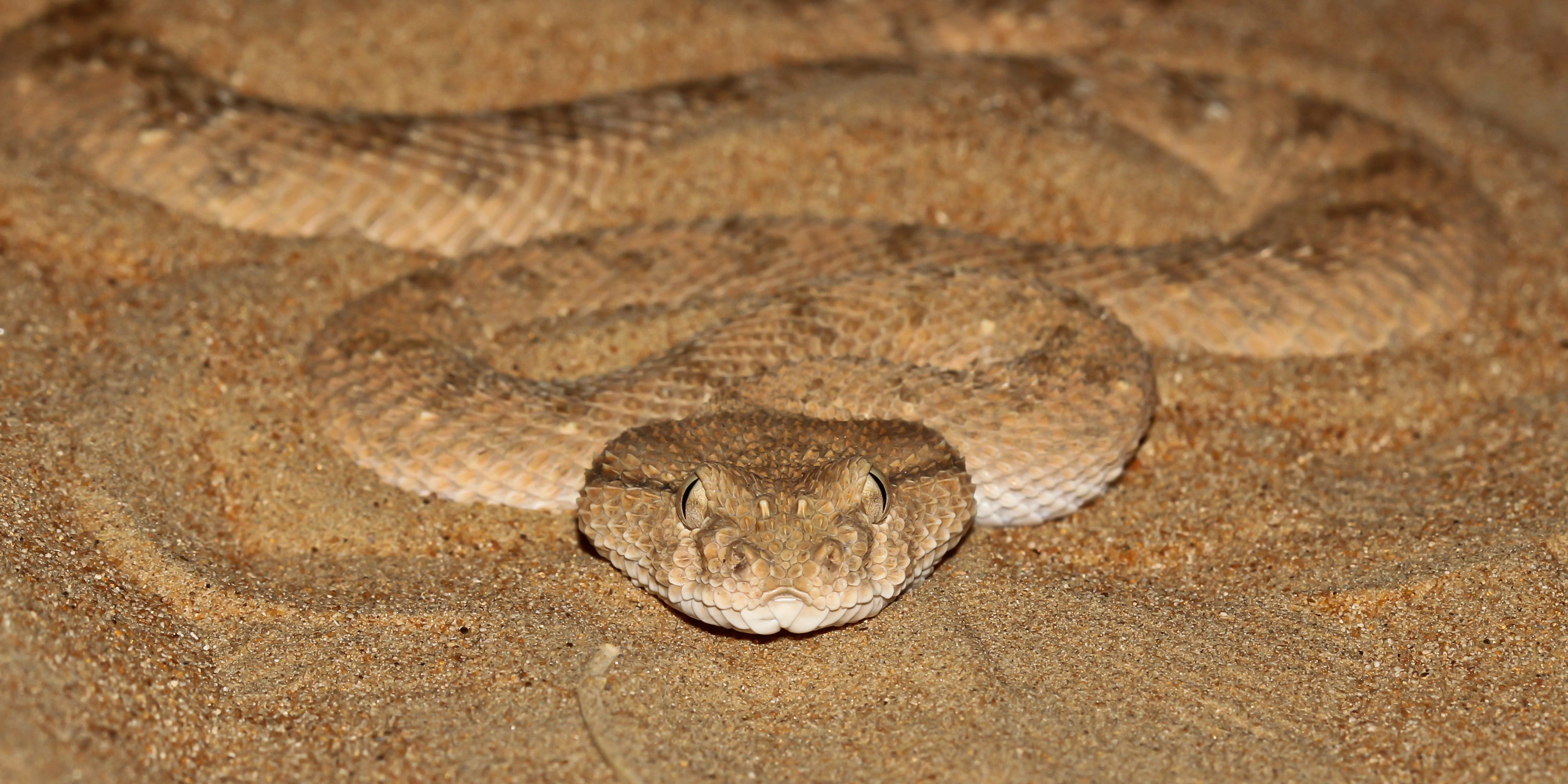
Arabian Horned Viper from Arabian Peninsula

Compared to many other snakes, vipers often appear rather sluggish. Most are ovoviviparous: the eggs are retained inside the mother's body, and the young emerge living. However, a few lay eggs in nests. Typically, the number of young in a clutch remains constant, but as the weight of the mother increases, larger eggs are produced, yielding larger young.

== Geographic range ==
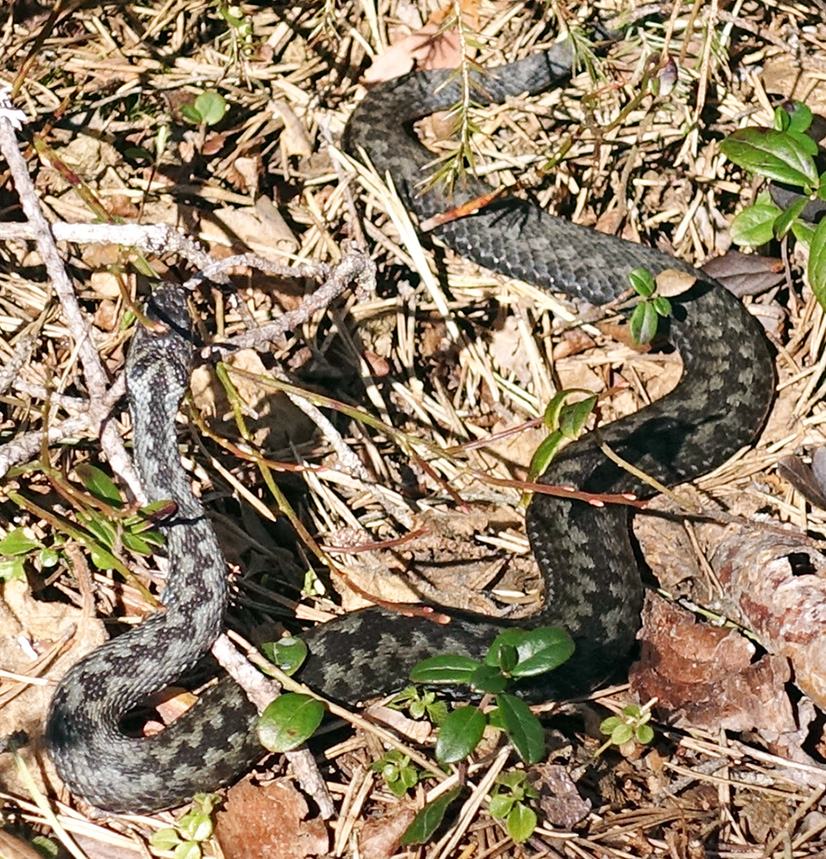
Vipera berus pictured in Laukaa, Finland, in May 2020

Viperid snakes are found in the Americas, Africa, Eurasia, and South Asia. In the Americas, they are native from south of 48°N. In the Old World, viperids are located everywhere except Siberia, Ireland, and north of the Arctic Circle save for in Norway and Sweden. Wild viperids are not found in Australia. The common adder, a viperid, is the only venomous snake found in Great Britain.

== Venom ==
Viperid venoms typically contain an abundance of protein-degrading enzymes, called proteases, that produce symptoms such as pain, strong local swelling and necrosis, blood loss from cardiovascular damage complicated by coagulopathy, and disruption of the blood-clotting system. Also being vasculotoxic in nature, viperine venom causes vascular endothelial damage and hemolysis. Death is usually caused by collapse in blood pressure. This is in contrast to elapid venoms, which generally contain neurotoxins that disable muscle contraction and cause paralysis. Death from elapid bites usually results from asphyxiation because the diaphragm can no longer contract, but this rule does not always apply; some elapid bites include proteolytic symptoms typical of viperid bites, while some viperid bites produce neurotoxic symptoms.

Proteolytic venom is also dual-purpose: first, it is used for defense and to immobilize prey, as with neurotoxic venoms; second, many of the venom's enzymes have a digestive function, breaking down molecules such as lipids, nucleic acids, and proteins. This is an important adaptation, as many vipers have inefficient digestive systems.

Due to the nature of proteolytic venom, a viperid bite is often a very painful experience and should always be taken seriously, though it may not necessarily prove fatal. Even with prompt and proper treatment, a bite can still result in a permanent scar, and in the worst cases, the affected limb may even have to be amputated. A victim's fate is impossible to predict, as this depends on many factors, including the species and size of the snake involved, how much venom was injected (if any), and the size and condition of the patient before being bitten. Viper bite victims may also be allergic to the venom or the antivenom.

=== Behavior ===
These snakes can decide how much venom to inject depending on the circumstances. The most important determinant of venom expenditure is generally the size of the snake; larger specimens can deliver much more venom. The species is also important, since some are likely to inject more venom than others, may have more venom available, strike more accurately, or deliver a number of bites in a short time. In predatory bites, factors that influence the amount of venom injected include the size of the prey, the species of prey, and whether the prey item is held or released. The need to label prey for chemosensory relocation after a bite and release may also play a role. In defensive bites, the amount of venom injected may be determined by the size or species of the predator (or antagonist), as well as the assessed level of threat, although larger assailants and higher threat levels may not necessarily lead to larger amounts of venom being injected.

=== Prey tracking ===
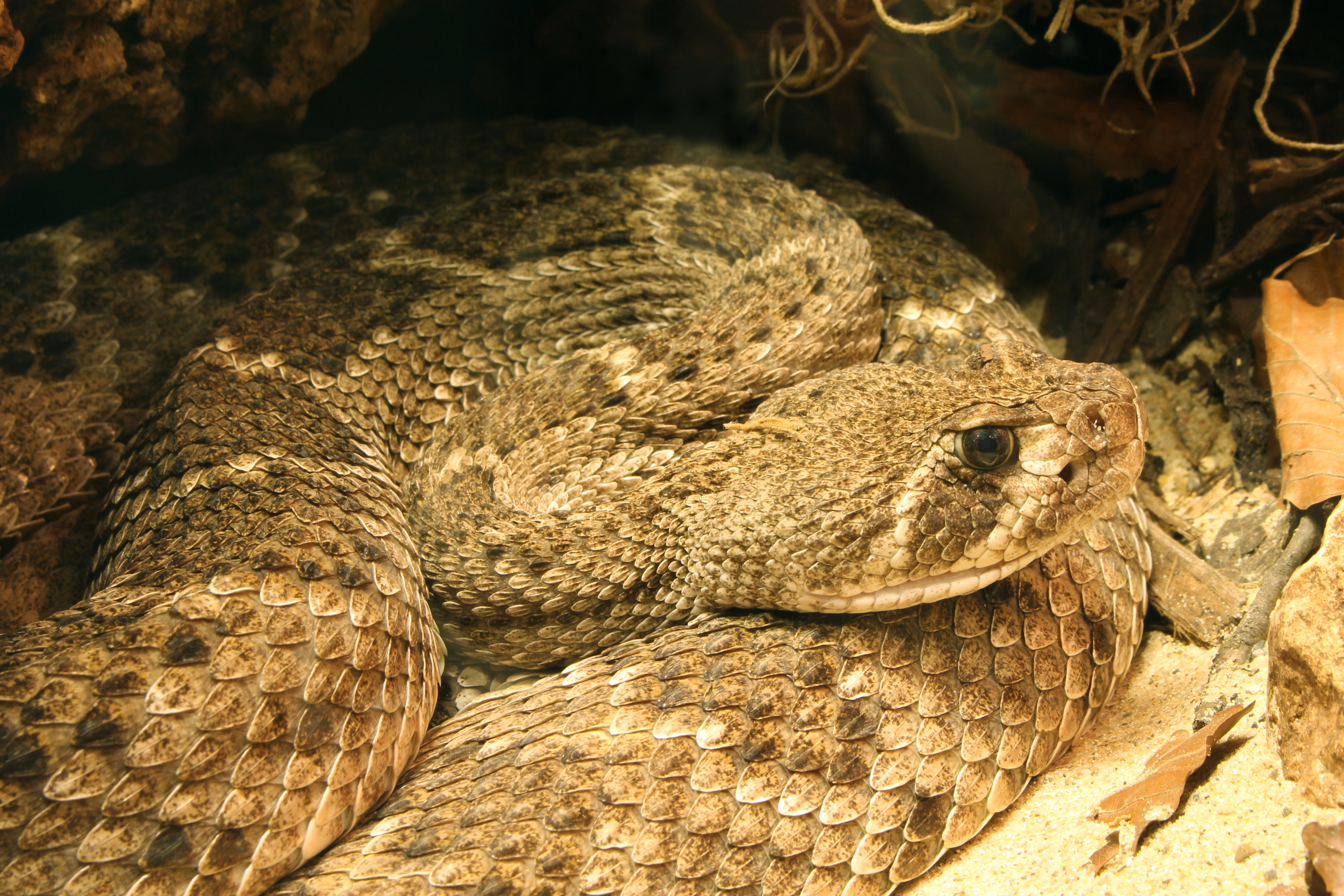
The western diamondback rattlesnake Crotalus atrox, the venom of which contains proteins allowing the snake to track down bitten prey

Hemotoxic venom takes more time than neurotoxic venom to immobilize prey, so viperid snakes need to track down prey animals after they have been bitten, in a process known as "prey relocalization". Vipers are able to do this via certain proteins contained in their venom. This important adaptation allowed rattlesnakes to evolve the strike-and-release bite mechanism, which provided a huge benefit to snakes by minimizing contact with potentially dangerous prey animals. This adaptation, then, requires the snake to track down the bitten animal to eat it, in an environment full of other animals of the same species. Western diamondback rattlesnakes respond more actively to mouse carcasses that have been injected with crude rattlesnake venom. When the various components of the venom were separated out, the snakes responded to mice injected with two kinds of disintegrins, which are responsible for allowing the snakes to track down their prey.

== Subfamilies ==
Subfamily	Taxon author	Genera	Common name	Geographic range
Azemiopinae	Liem, Marx & Rabb, 1971	1	Fea's vipers	Myanmar, southeastern Tibet across South China (Fujian, Guangxi, Jiangxi, Guizhou, Sichuan, Yunnan, Zhejiang) to Northern Vietnam
Crotalinae	Oppel, 1811	22	Pit vipers	In the Old World from Eastern Europe eastward through Asia to Japan, Taiwan, Indonesia, Peninsular India and Sri Lanka; in the New World from southern Canada southward through Mexico and Central America to southern South America
Viperinae	Oppel, 1811	13	True or pitless vipers	Europe, Asia, and Africa

Type genus = Vipera Laurenti, 1768

== Sensory organs ==
=== Heat-sensing pits ===
Pit vipers have specialized sensory organs near the nostrils called heat-sensing pits. The location of this organ is unique to pit vipers. These pits have the ability to detect thermal radiation emitted by warm-blooded animals, helping them better understand their environment. Internally the organ forms a small pit lined with membranes, external and internal, attached to the trigeminal nerve. Infrared light signals the internal membranes, which in turn signal the trigeminal nerve and send the infrared signals to the brain, where they are overlaid onto the visual image created by the eyes.

== Taxonomy ==
Whether family Viperidae is attributed to Oppel (1811), as opposed to Laurenti (1768) or Gray (1825), is subject to some interpretation. The consensus among leading experts, though, is that Laurenti used viperae as the plural of vipera (Latin for "viper", "adder", or "snake") and did not intend for it to indicate a family group taxon. Rather, it is attributed to Oppel, based on his Viperini as a distinct family group name, despite the fact that Gray was the first to use the form Viperinae.

== Allusively ==
The term "viper" has been used historically of a spiteful or malignant person, a false or treacherous person.

It is also an obsolete term for a marijuana smoker, or habitual user of other drugs.

== See also ==
- List of snakes, overview of all snake families and genera

- List of largest snakes

- Snakebite
