= Vera Smith =

Vera Smith may refer to:

- Vera Lutz (1912–1976), born Vera Smith, British economist
- Vera Smith, character in The Dead Zone
- Vera Smith (figure skater) (1932–2012), Canadian figure skater
