= Franz Böhm =

German politician, lawyer, and economist

- Böhm in 1950

Member of the Bundestag; from Hesse
- In office 6 October 1953 – 19 October 1965
- Preceded by: Georg Stierle
- Succeeded by: Multi-member district
- Constituency: Frankfurt/M III (1953–1961); State list (1961–1965)

Personal details
- Born: Franz Josef Emil Böhm; 16 February 1895 Konstanz, Germany
- Died: 26 September 1977 (aged 82) Rockenberg, West Germany
- Party: Christian Democratic Union
- Spouse: Marietta Ceconi (m. 1926)
- Relatives: Ricarda Huch (mother-in-law)
- Education: University of Freiburg
- Occupation: University Professor

Franz Böhm (16 February 1895 – 26 September 1977) was a German politician, lawyer, and economist.

== Early life ==
Franz Böhm was born on 16 February 1895 in Konstanz. He moved along with his family in 1898 to Karlsruhe as his father was appointed the Minister of Cultural Affairs for the Grand Duke of Baden.

== Early career ==
After completing his Abitur and military service, Böhm enlisted in the military at the beginning of World War I. He was the first citizen of Karlsruhe to be awarded the Iron Cross. In 1919 Böhn began studying law and political science at the University of Freiburg and completed his Staatsexamen in 1924, receiving shortly thereafter a job as a public prosecutor.

Böhm published his first essay entitled "Das Problem der privaten Macht, ein Beitrag zur Monopolfrage" (The problem of private power; a contribution to the question of monopolies) in 1928, establishing himself as a prominent economist. In the wake of the publication of this essay, fellow economists Alexander Rüstow and Friedrich Lutz strongly encouraged Böhm to write a disputation of the economic work of Adam Smith. Böhm eagerly took up their suggestion and wrote what would become his principal work: "Wettbewerb und Monopolkampf."

After writing these pieces Böhm received a professorship at the University of Freiburg, where he and colleague Walter Eucken established the Freiburger Schule. During this time Böhm worked closely with Eucken and Hans Grossmann-Doerth in establishing the groundwork for their economic theory, Ordoliberalism.

From 1925 to 1931 Böhm served in the economic ministry of the Weimar Republic.

== Nazi era ==
The liberal economic beliefs of the Freiburger Schule directly contrasted the economic beliefs of the Nazi Regime. Every assembly of the Freiburger Schule was therefore a direct afront to the regime. Public discussions became evermore dangerous, so the school was quickly forced to begin meeting secretly. During this time the assembly began calling itself the "Diehl-Seminar" in recognition of its meeting place, the home of Karl Diehl.

Böhm had his ability to teach revoked from him by the Nazis in 1938 due to his public outspokenness against the anti-Jewish policies of the regime. During the same year, Böhm became active in the Freiburger Konzil, which served as a meeting point for anti-Nazi professors from the university and pastors of the Confessing Church. Böhm became heavily involved throughout the following years in opposition groups such as the Bonhoeffer-Krise and the Arbeitsgemeinschaft Erwin von Beckerath, a council of liberal economists opposed to Nazi economic practices.

Only through name confusion resulting from a mistake by the Nazis was Böhm able to avoid arrest after the failed July 20 plot. This confusion relates to the arrest of the Roman Catholic priest Franz Boehm, who had already been arrested on June 5, 1944 for preaching against the Nazi film industry.

== Post-war and political career ==
After the war Böhm was able to resume teaching in Freiburg and was granted the position of Prorector. In 1946 he accepted a professorship at the University of Freiburg. During his time at the university he worked with Walter Eucken to found the German scholarly journal ORDO in 1948, which remains today a mouthpiece of German institutional economists.

During this time Böhm became active in politics, joining the CDU shortly after the war. He served as the minister of cultural affairs in Hessen under Karl Geiler from 1 November 1945 until February 1946, when he resigned due to differences of opinion with the American occupying forces.

Böhm was a member of the German Bundestag from 1953 until 1965. During this time he was the leader of the German delegation for the reparations negotiations with Israel.

Throughout his time in the Bundestag Böhm remained deeply connected to the University of Freiburg and his students, continuing to provide seminars despite his role in the Bundestag. His political role remained secondary in importance to his career as an instructor. Böhm died on 26 September 1977 in Rockenberg.

The Franz-Böhm Schule, a Berufsschule in Frankfurt am Main, is named in his honor.

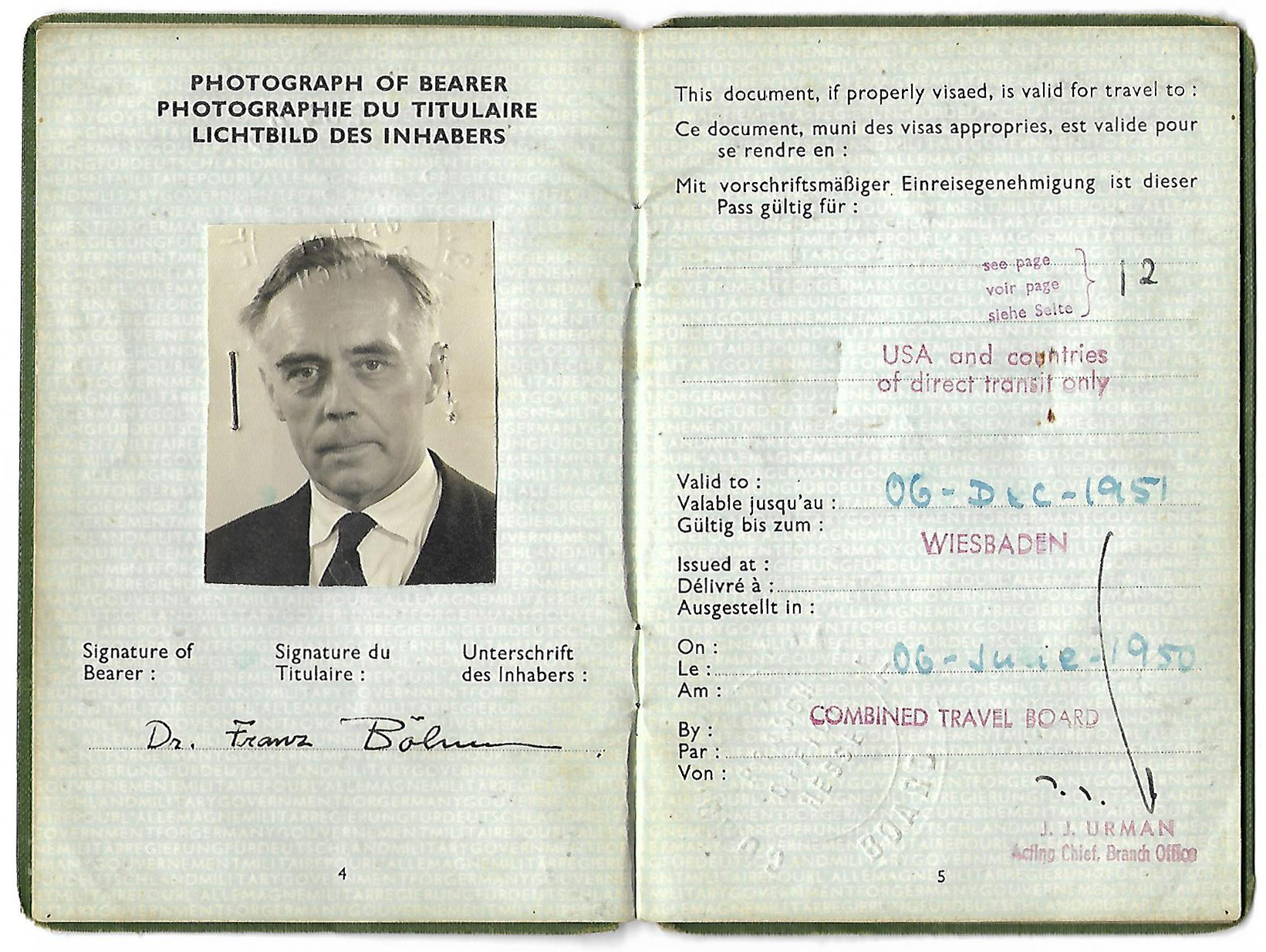
1950 Allied issued passport to Franz Böhm
