= Dry bite =

Bite that does not release venom

A dry bite is a bite by a venomous animal in which no venom is released. Dry snake bites are called "venomous snake bite without envenoming". A dry bite from a snake can still be painful, and be accompanied by bleeding, inflammation, swelling and/or erythema. It may also lead to infection, including tetanus.

Dry bites can occur from all snakes, but their frequency varies from species to species. For example, Australian eastern brown snakes (Pseudonaja textilis) can inflict dry bites 80% of the time while taipans inflict dry bites only 5% of the time. About 50% of snakebite cases can be dry bites. They are characterized by fang and tooth marks and the absence of injected venom.

The first clinically observed dry snake bite occurred in London in 1892, from a South American rattlesnake. The term "dry bite" has been in use since the early 1980s.

== Reasons for a dry bite ==
A dry bite can be deliberate on the part of the animal (delivered as a "warning"), happen by accident or be the result of a property of the animal or the target. Recent scholarship identifies seven main snake-related causes for a dry bite from a snake:

- Gland infection
- Trauma after defence
- Trauma after extraction of venom
- Duct calcification or obstruction
- Venom metering
- Empty gland
- Misjudgement of the distance to victim, leading to only partial penetration or a premature ejection of venom

A variety of factors lead to different dry bite patterns in younger and older snakes. Neonate and juvenile snakes are less likely to "meter" their venom, and therefore usually empty their venom glands when they bite. Older snakes can replenish venom quicker after it has been depleted, but are also more likely to have calcified or obstructed venom ducts.

The victim can also affect whether a bite is dry, if they pulled away when bitten or they were wearing thicker clothes.

== Treatment ==
In practice, it is not necessarily simple to tell a dry bite from a dangerously venomous bite. In the case of a potential dry bite from a snake, the wound should still be cleaned, a tetanus prophylaxis delivered, and the victim monitored for up to 12 hours in case the bite was venomous and antivenom and/or ancillary treatments are required.

Dry bites are often confusing for the attending physician and the victim. The phenomenon can be misinterpreted as evidence for the effectiveness of supposed miracle cures.

In the event of a dry bite, antivenom should not be taken, as it has unneeded side effects.

== By animal variety ==
In 2020, academics consolidated 33 studies into dry bite prevalence among snakes. The studies found a great variety of dry bite prevalence by species, although different criteria for diagnosis were used. The studies found dry bite incidence of anywhere between 4% and 50%. It is difficult to measure dry bite incidence rates because some "wet" (envenomed) bites may go unreported or result in minor or no symptoms, or the species of snake may be misidentified (for example, a bite from a non-venomous snake attributed to a venomous one).

Dry bites from spiders such as tarantulas and large Sparassidae are common and, where correctly identified, can simply be ignored or, if appropriate, treated using mild antiseptics. On the other hand, some reports clearly suggest that some of their bites cause marked neurotoxic effects. For example, in South Africa the common "Rain Spider" Palystes castaneus and similar species, is usually described as negligibly venomous, and certainly it is at the least difficult to find documented cases of serious effects.

== See also ==
- Snakebite
- Spider bite
