= Sensorium =

Organism's perception of its environment with all of its senses

A sensorium (pl.: sensoria) is the apparatus of an organism's perception considered as a whole. It is the "seat of sensation" where it experiences, perceives and interprets the environments within which it lives. The term originally entered English from the Late Latin in the mid-17th century, from the stem sens- ("sense"). In earlier use it referred, in a broader sense, to the brain as the mind's organ (Oxford English Dictionary 1989). In medical, psychological, and physiological discourse it has come to refer to the total character of the unique and changing sensory environments perceived by individuals. These include the sensation, perception, and interpretation of information about the world around us by using faculties of the mind such as senses, phenomenal and psychological perception, cognition, and intelligence.

== Ratios of sensation ==
In the 20th century, the sensorium became a key part of the theories of Marshall McLuhan, Edmund Carpenter and Walter J. Ong (Carpenter and McLuhan 1960; Ong 1991).

McLuhan, like his mentor Harold Innis, believed that media were biased according to time and space. He paid particular attention to what he called the sensorium, or the effects of media on our senses, positing that media affect us by manipulating the ratio of our senses. For example, the alphabet stresses the sense of sight, which in turn causes us to think in linear, objective terms. The medium of the alphabet thus has the effect of reshaping the way in which we, collectively and individually, perceive and understand our environment in what has been termed the Alphabet Effect.

Focusing on variations in the sensorium across social contexts, these theorists collectively suggest that the world is explained and experienced differently depending on the specific "ratios of sense" that members of a culture share in the sensoria they learn to inhabit (Howes 1991, p. 8). More recent work has demonstrated that individuals may include in their unique sensoria perceptual proclivities that exceed their cultural norms; even when, as in the history of smell in the West, the sense in question is suppressed or mostly ignored (Classen, Howes and Synnott 1994).

This interplay of various ways of conceiving the world could be compared to the experience of synesthesia, where stimulus of one sense causes a perception by another, seemingly unrelated sense, as in musicians who can taste the intervals between notes they hear (Beeli et al., 2005), or artists who can smell colors. Many individuals who have one or more senses restricted or lost develop a sensorium with a ratio of sense which favors those they possess more fully. Frequently the blind or deaf speak of a compensating effect, whereby their sense of touch or smell becomes more acute, changing the way they perceive and reason about the world; especially telling examples are found in the cases of "wild children", whose early childhoods were spent in abusive, neglected, or non-human environments, both intensifying and minimizing perceptual abilities (Classen 1991).

== Development of unique sensoria in cultures and individuals ==
Although some consider these modalities abnormal, it is more likely that these examples demonstrate the contextual and socially learned nature of sensation. A 'normal' sensorium and a 'synesthetic' one differ based on the division, connection, and interplay of the body's manifold sensory apparatus. A synesthete has simply developed a different set of relationships, including cognitive or interpretive skills which deliver unique abilities and understanding of the world (Beeli et al., 2005). The sensorium is a creation of the physical, biological, social, and cultural environments of the individual organism and its relationships while being in the world.

What is considered a strange blurring of sensation from one perspective, is a normal and 'natural' way of perception of the world in another, and indeed many individuals and their cultures develop sensoria fundamentally different from the vision-centric modality of most Western science and culture. One revealing contrast is the thought of a former Russian on the matter:

The dictionary of the Russian language...defines the sense of touch as follows: "In reality all five senses can be reduced to one---the sense of touch. The tongue and palate sense the food; the ear, sound waves; the nose, emanations; the eyes, rays of light." That is why in all textbooks the sense of touch is always mentioned first. It means to ascertain, to perceive, by body, hand or fingers (Anonymous 1953).

As David Howes explains:

The reference to Russian textbooks treating touch first, in contrast to American psychology textbooks which always begin with sight, is confirmed by other observers (Simon 1957) and serves to highlight how the hierarchization of the senses can vary significantly even between cultures belonging to the same general tradition (here, that of "the West") (2003, pp. 12-13).

== Sensory ecology and anthropology ==
These sorts of insights were the impetus for the development of the burgeoning field of sensory anthropology, which seeks to understand other cultures from within their own unique sensoria. Anthropologists such as Paul Stoller (1989) and Michael Jackson (1983, 1989) have focused on a critique of the hegemony of vision and textuality in the social sciences. They argue for an understanding and analysis that is embodied, one sensitive to the unique context of sensation of those one wishes to understand. They believe that a thorough awareness and adoption of other sensoria is a key requirement if ethnography is to approach true understanding.

A related area of study is sensory (or perceptual) ecology. This field aims at understanding the unique sensory and interpretive systems all organisms develop, based on the specific ecological environments they live in, experience and adapt to. A key researcher in this field has been psychologist James J. Gibson, who has written numerous seminal volumes considering the senses in terms of holistic, self-contained perceptual systems. These exhibit their own mindful, interpretive behaviour, rather than acting simply as conduits delivering information for cognitive processing, as in more representational philosophies of perception or theories of psychology (1966, 1979). Perceptual systems detect affordances in objects in the world, directing attention towards information about an object in terms of the possible uses it affords an organism.

The individual sensory systems of the body are only parts of these broader perceptual ecologies, which include the physical apparatus of sensation, the environment being sensed, as well as both learned and innate systems for directing attention and interpreting the results. These systems represent and enact the information (as an influence which leads to a transformation) required to perceive, identify or reason about the world, and are distributed across the very design and structures of the body, in relation to the physical environment, as well as in the concepts and interpretations of the mind. This information varies according to species, physical environment, and the context of information in the social and cultural systems of perception, which also change over time and space, and as an individual learns through living. Any single perceptual modality may include or overlap multiple sensory structures, as well as other modes of perception, and the sum of their relations and the ratio of mixture and importance comprise a sensorium. The perception, understanding, and reasoning of an organism is dependent on the particular experience of the world delivered by changing ratios of sense.

== Clouded sensorium ==
A clouded sensorium, also known as an altered sensorium, is a medical condition characterized by the inability to think clearly or concentrate. It is usually synonymous with, or substantially overlapping with, altered level of consciousness. It is associated with a huge variety of underlying causes from drug induced states to pathogenic states induced by disease or mineral deficiency to neurotrauma.

== See also ==
- Reality tunnel

== References and further reading ==
- "Sensorium." 1989. Oxford English Dictionary. J.A. Simpson and E.S.C. Weiner, eds. 2nd ed. Oxford: Clarendon Press. OED Online. Oxford University Press. Accessed 15 April 2005. http://oed.com/cgi/entry/50219915 (subscription required)
- Anonymous. 1953. "Russian Sensory Images." In The Study of Culture at a Distance, Margaret Mead and Rhoda Métraux, eds. Chicago: University of Chicago Press. pp. 162–69.
- Beeli, Gian, Michaela Esslen and Lutz Jäncke. 2005. "Synaesthesia: When Coloured Sounds Taste Sweet." Nature 434 (38). <http://www.nature.com/cgi-taf/DynaPage.taf?file=/nature/journal/v434/n7029/full/434038a_fs.html>. Accessed 15 April 2005.
- Carpenter, Edmund and Marshall McLuhan, eds. 1960. Explorations in Communication. Boston: Beacon Press.
- Classen, Constance. 1991. The Sensory Orders of 'Wild Children.' In The Varieties of Sensory Experience. David Howes, ed. Toronto: University of Toronto Press. Pp. 47-60.
- Classen, Constance, David Howes and Anthony Synott. 1994. Aroma: The Cultural History of Smell. London and New York: Routledge.
- Coté, Mark. 2010. “Technics and the Human Sensorium: Rethinking Media Theory through the Body” Theory and Event. 13:4 Accessed 26 November 2011
- Gibson, James J. 1966. The Senses Considered as Perceptual Systems. Boston: Houghton Mifflin.
- Gibson, James J. 1979. The Ecological Approach to Visual Perception. Boston: Houghton Mifflin.
- Howes, David, ed. 1991. The Varieties of Sensory Experience. Toronto: University of Toronto Press.
- Howes, David. 2003. Sensual Relations: Engaging the Senses in Culture and Social Theory. Ann Arbor, MI: University of Michigan Press.
- Jackson, Michael. 1983. "Thinking through the Body: An Essay on Understanding Metaphor." Social Analysis 14:127-48.
- Jackson, Michael. 1989. Paths toward a Clearing: Radical Empiricism and Ethnographic Inquiry. Bloomington: Indiana University Press.
- MedTerms. 3 January 2001. "Sensorium - Medical Dictionary." Accessed 15 April 2004.
- Ong, Walter J. 1991. The Shifting Sensorium. In The Varieties of Sensory Experience. David Howes, ed. Toronto: University of Toronto Press. Pp. 47-60.
- Simon, B., ed. 1957. Psychology in the Soviet Union. Stanford: Stanford University Press.
- Stoller, Paul. 1989. The Taste of Ethnographic Things: The Senses in Anthropology. Philadelphia: University of Pennsylvania Press.
- Trippy, Dr. 2006 "Dr Trippy's Sensorium." This is a website dedicated to the study of the human sensorium and social organisation.
