= ORDO =

- Discipline: Economics, Political Science, Law
- Language: English, German

Publication details
- History: 1948–present
- Publisher: De Gruyter (Germany)

Standard abbreviations
- ISO 4: ORDO

Indexing
- ISSN: 0048-2129

Links
- Journal homepage

ORDO, short for The Yearbook of Economic and Social Order (German: Jahrbuch für die Ordnung von Wirtschaft und Gesellschaft) and often referred to as the Ordo Yearbook, is a peer-reviewed academic journal established in 1948 by German economists Walter Eucken and Franz Böhm. The journal focuses on the economic and political institutions governing modern society.

== History ==
The term ordoliberalism was coined echoing the journal's title. Furthermore, the concept of social market economy, being the main economic model used in Western and Northern Europe during and after the Cold War era, has been developed nearly exclusively within ORDO.

Today, the journal's mission is to provide a forum of debate for scholars of diverse disciplines such as economics, law, political science, sociology, and philosophy. ORDO is published annually. Articles are published either in German or in English. ORDO also contains book reviews.
