= Friedrich Lutz (economist) =

German economist (1901–1975)

Friedrich August Lutz (29 December 1901, Sarrebourg; 4 October 1975, Zürich) was a German economist who developed the expectations hypothesis.

== Life ==
In 1920, Lutz graduated from high school in Stuttgart. He studied economics at Heidelberg University and Humboldt University of Berlin, where he met economist Walter Eucken, and went on to graduate from the University of Tübingen in 1925.

Lutz's first job was for the Association of German Engineering Institutions (Verein deutscher Maschinenbau-Anstalten (VdMA)) in Berlin. In 1929, he took a job as an assistant to Walter Eucken at Albert Ludwig University and lived in Freiburg. In 1934–1935, he had a Rockefeller Foundation fellowship in England, after which he returned to Germany to again work for Eucken. However, Lutz was unable to continue his academic work because his liberal ideas were in conflict with those of the Nazi regime. In March 1937, he married Vera Smith, an economist, and they traveled to the United States on another Rockefeller Foundation fellowship, 1937–1938. After the fellowship ended, the couple remained in the United States, and in the fall of 1938 Lutz took a job as an instructor at Princeton University.

During World War II Lutz worked at Princeton and rose to the rank of full professor. His wife worked as an economist at the International Finance Section of Princeton University and then for the League of Nations, also located in Princeton, New Jersey. It was while he was at Princeton that he published his paper explaining the expectations hypothesis. For the 1951–1952 academic year, Lutz was a guest professor at Freiburg, after which he left Princeton and in 1953 became a professor at the University of Zurich. In the 1962–1963 academic year, he was a visiting professor at Yale University, but he returned to Zürich where he taught until retiring in 1972. He died in Zurich three years later.

Lutz and his wife were long-time members of the Mont Pelerin Society, and Lutz was its president from 1964 to 1967.

== Theories and work ==
Working under Eucken, Lutz was in the inner circle of the ordoliberal Freiburg School of economics and law, where Eucken, Hans Großmann-Doerth and Franz Böhm were abandoning the traditional German historical and descriptive approach and were beginning work on the basic theoretical issues surrounding a market economy and what makes for a competitive economy. After leaving Freiburg, Lutz continued in this same vein at Princeton.

Following the work of Irving Fisher on interest, Lutz publisher his seminal paper "The structure of interest rates" in 1940 in which he described the expectations hypothesis. He elaborated on the concept three years later in his paper "Professor Hayek's theory of interest".

Even before moving to the University of Zürich, through his wife Lutz had become interested in the problems of international monetary policies, and in 1950 he and his wife collaborated on the book Monetary and Foreign Exchange Policy in Italy. In 1962, he summarized his work on these issues in the short book The Problem of International Economic Equilibrium, followed by a second shorter book, The Problem of International Liquidity and the Multiple-Currency Standard, the following year. In those he set out his arguments that the most effective and economical sound method of dealing with the foreign exchange of currencies would be fully flexible exchange rates among currencies. Realizing that this solution was and would be unacceptable to international banking houses, he developed his "second best" solution of having a multiple-currency standard, a mix of currencies. Being well aware of the problems with including gold in the mix, he warned that any such inclusion must be coupled with gold liquidity.

Friedrich and his wife also collaborated on The Theory of Investment of the Firm (1951), among other publications.

== Influences ==
Among the many economists that Lutz influenced was Paul A. Volcker later to be Chairman of the United States Federal Reserve.

== Selected works ==
- 1940 "The structure of interest rates", Quarterly Journal of Economics 55: pp. 36–63
- 1943 "Professor Hayek's theory of interest", Economica (new series) 10(40): pp. 302–310
- 1967 The Theory of Interest Dordrecht, Netherlands: D. Reidel
