= Anne Mae Lutz =

Anne Mae Lutz (March 18, 1871 – January 15, 1938) was an American plant geneticist. She studied mutations in Oenothera lamarckiana and demonstrated that the mutation gigas had an extra set of chromosomes leading to studies on the artificial induction of polyploidy.

== Life and work ==
Lutz was one of eight children of Samuel B. and Eleanor E. (Gougar) Lutz. She studied in a one-room school in Union Township before joining Purdue University where she received a BS in 1890 after just three years of study. She received an MS in 1891 in biology and received another BS from the University of Michigan in 1893 where she was influenced by Volney M. Spaulding. She then worked as a cytologist at Columbia University and then went to the University of Chicago for a year working with William Lawrence Tower. Tower was a student of Charles Davenport who hired her in 1903 to joined the Carnegie Institute of Experimental Evolution, Cold Springs Harbor, where she worked with Hugo de Vries, George Harrison Shull (1874–1954), and others until 1911. Her initial salary was $750 per annum and she was noted for her cytological preparations. In 1907 she discovered extra sets of chromosomes in Oenothera. Reginald Ruggles Gates who also worked on polyploidy shortly after this came into conflict with contrary claims of priority. In 1909 she was not allowed leave to spend on her family farm in Indiana by Davenport. Along with Shull, she also expressed resentment on the management of the institute by Davenport, the exclusion of staff from certain events and a number of other incidents. A complaint was written to R. S. Woodward of the Carnegie Institute. This led to her being fired in February 1911 for insubordination by director Davenport. Shull resigned a few weeks later but withdrew it (although he left shortly after in 1915 to Princeton). She went to Europe after than and studied at the Catholic University of Louvain, Belgium, becoming its first woman student in 200 years. She also researched in Holland before returning home in 1916. She published most of her work between 1907 and 1917. She made microscopic slides as a business for a while. She worked for tuberculosis associations and for the League of Women Voters in her spare time. She was offered a job by Harvard University during World War I but poor health prevented her from taking them. In 1932 she received an honorary doctorate from Purdue University for her contribution to the study of polyploidy.
