= Rockenberg =

Municipality in Hesse, Germany

- Municipality
- Coat of arms

- Location of Rockenberg within Wetteraukreis district
- Interactive map of Rockenberg
- Location within Germany Location within Hesse
- Coordinates: 50°25′51″N 8°44′8″E
- Country: Germany
- State: Hesse
- Admin. region: Darmstadt
- District: Wetteraukreis
- Subdivisions: 2 districts

Government
  - Mayor (2021–27): Olga Schneider

Area
  - Total: 16.14 km^{2} (6.23 sq mi)
- Elevation: 157 m (515 ft)

Population (2025-12-31)
  - Total: 4,165
  - Density: 258.1/km^{2} (668.4/sq mi)
- Time zone: UTC+01:00 (CET)
  - Summer (DST): UTC+02:00 (CEST)
- Postal codes: 35519
- Dialling codes: 06033
- Vehicle registration: FB
- Website: www.rockenberg.de

Rockenberg (German pronunciation: [ˈʁɔkn̩ˌbɛʁk]) is a municipality in the Wetteraukreis, in Hesse, Germany. It is located approximately 36 kilometers north of Frankfurt am Main. Rockenberg is divided into the districts of Rockenberg and Oppershofen.
