= Vera Lutz =

British economist

- Born: Vera Smith; 1912; Kent, England
- Died: 20 August 1976 (aged 63–64)
- Occupation: Economist
- Spouse: Friedrich Lutz

Academic background
- Education: London School of Economics

Academic work
- Discipline: Economics
- Sub-discipline: Credit theory; Economic development theory; Labour economics

Vera Constance Lutz (née Smith, 1912–1976) was a British economist. She was married to the German economist Friedrich Lutz.

== Career ==
Smith was born in Kent, England, and studied at the London School of Economics between 1930 and 1935 for a PhD. In 1937, she married German economist Friedrich Lutz, and the couple moved to Princeton University prior to the start of the Second World War, and moved to Zurich in 1951. Lutz's main areas of study were credit theory, economic development theory and labour economics. Vera and Friedrich's 1951 work Theory of Investment of the Firm was said to have "greatly influenced modern capital theory, and would remain a major source of reference for the next decade". Lutz's work Italy, a Study in Economic Development used neoclassical economics, and focused on the differences between Northern and Southern Italy, and the monopolistic behaviour of Italian industry. Vera and Friedrich had been invited to Italy by the Banca d'Italia.

== Works ==
- The Rationale of Central Banking and the Free Banking Alternative. Indianapolis: Liberty Fund. 1936 – via Online Library of Liberty.
- Lutz, Vera; Friedrich Lutz (1951). Theory of Investment of the Firm. Princeton: Princeton University Press – via Internet Archive.
- Real and Monetary Factors in the Determination of Employment Levels, 1952.
- Multiplier and Velocity Analysis: A Marriage, 1955.
- Italy, a Study in Economic Development. London, New York, Toronto: Oxford University Press. 1963 – via Internet Archive.
- Central Planning for the Market Economy: An Analysis of the French Theory and Experience. London and Harlow: Longmans. 1969.
