= Lutz Winde =

German actor and director (born 1966)

- Born: 1 July 1966; Bonn, Germany
- Occupations: Actor and Director

Lutz Winde (born 1 July 1966 in Bonn, Germany) is a German actor and director.

Winde studied acting at the Zinner Studio in Munich. He had further experience at the Herbert Berghof Studio in New York City, and studied directing at the New York Film Academy. He has won some awards for his short films and directed a series and a TV movie in Germany. He acts in German TV, films, and a daily soap opera.
