= Jack Lutz =

American computer scientist

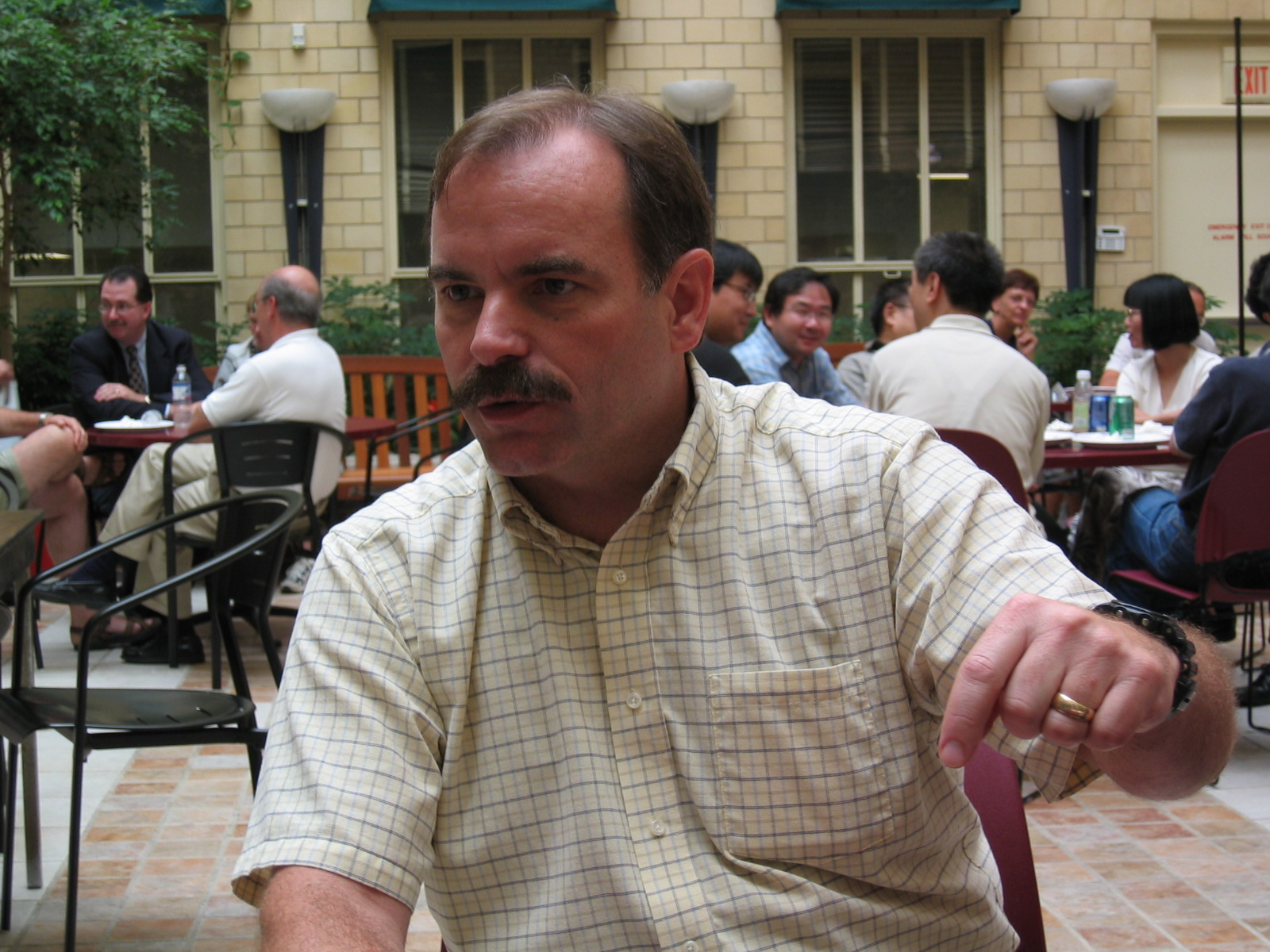
Lutz in 2003

Jack Lutz is an American theoretical computer scientist best known for developing the concepts of resource-bounded measure and effective dimension; he has also published research on DNA computing and self-assembly. He is a professor of computer science and mathematics at Iowa State University.

== Education and career ==
Lutz was a student at the University of Kansas, graduating in 1976 and earning master's degrees in mathematics and in computer science there in 1979 and 1981 respectively. He went to the California Institute of Technology for doctoral study in mathematics, and completed his Ph.D. in 1987, with the dissertation Resource-Bounded Category and Measure in Exponential Complexity Classes supervised by Alexander S. Kechris.

He has spent the rest of his career at Iowa State University, as an assistant professor from 1987 to 1992, associate professor from 1992 to 1996, and full professor since 1996. At Iowa State, he directs the Laboratory for Molecular Programming.

== Personal life ==
Lutz is married to Robyn Lutz, a professor of computer science at Iowa State University; their son Neil Lutz is also a computer scientist and a visiting assistant professor of computer science at Swarthmore College. They have published together on algorithmic game theory in DNA computing.
