= Robyn Lutz =

American computer scientist

Robyn R. Lutz is an American computer scientist whose research involves software engineering, including modeling and checking software requirements and software system safety. She is a professor of computer science at Iowa State University.

== Education and career ==
Lutz majored in English at the University of Kansas, graduating with the highest distinction in 1974, earned a master's degree in Spanish there in 1976, and completed a Ph.D. in Spanish in 1980, under the supervision of Raymond Souza. Despite this non-technical background, she became a member of the technical staff at the Jet Propulsion Laboratory, associated with the California Institute of Technology, in 1983, and continued to hold an affiliation there until 2012.

Returning to graduate study, she earned a master's degree in computer science in 1990 from Iowa State University. She held an affiliate assistant professor title there from 1994 to 2000. In 2000 she became a regular-rank associate professor, and in 2005 she was promoted to full professor.

== Recognition ==
Lutz was named an ACM Distinguished Member in 2014. In 2021, she received the lifetime service award from the IEEE International Requirements Engineering Conference. She was elected as an IEEE Fellow in 2022, "for contributions to software requirements for safety-critical systems".

== Personal life ==
Lutz is married to Jack Lutz, a professor of mathematics and computer science at Iowa State University; their son Neil Lutz is also a computer scientist and a visiting assistant professor of computer science at Swarthmore College. They have published together on algorithmic game theory in DNA computing.
