= Lutz Jäncke =

German neuropsychologist

Lutz Jäncke (* July 16, 1957 in Wuppertal) is a German and Swiss neuropsychologist and a cognitive neuroscientist. From 2002 to 2022 he was professor and chair of neuropsychology at the University of Zurich.

== Early life and education ==
Jäncke studied psychology, neurophysiology and neuroscience at the Ruhr University Bochum, the Technical University of Braunschweig and the University of Düsseldorf, completing his degree in psychology at Düsseldorf in 1984. In 1989 he received his doctorate (Dr. rer. nat.) from the Faculty of Mathematics and Natural Sciences at Düsseldorf with a thesis on the role of audiophonatory coupling in speech control. In 1995 he completed his habilitation at the same faculty with a thesis on anatomical and functional hemispheric asymmetries, for which the faculty gave him an award.

== Career ==
In 1996 Jäncke was awarded a Heisenberg Fellowship by the German Research Foundation. After a research stay at the Beth Israel Deaconess Medical Center of Harvard Medical School, he worked as a senior researcher at the Forschungszentrum Jülich.

In 2020 Jäncke established Switzerland's postgraduate training programme in clinical neuropsychology (Diploma / Master of Advanced Studies in Neuropsychology Zurich), which is recognised by the Federal Office of Public Health. Since his retirement he has continued to work as a reviewer, editor, author and keynote speaker.

== Research ==
Jäncke's research deals primarily with the functional and structural neuroplasticity of the human brain. His studies employ neuroimaging methods, including functional magnetic resonance imaging and electroencephalography, together with brain stimulation methods such as transcranial magnetic stimulation and transcranial direct current stimulation.

=== Brain asymmetry and laterality ===
Jäncke's early work, much of it carried out with Helmuth Steinmetz and Gottfried Schlaug, used magnetic resonance imaging morphometry to study anatomical asymmetries of the human brain and their relationship to handedness and language lateralisation. He measured asymmetries of the planum temporale and described a neighbouring inferior parietal region he termed the planum parietale, reporting that handedness and sex interact in shaping its asymmetry.

=== Brain plasticity and the musician's brain ===
To investigate experience-driven plasticity in the intact human brain, Jäncke frequently uses professional musicians as a model population, because their many years of intensive practice produce measurable structural and functional adaptations. In a 1995 study in Science with Schlaug, Yanxiong Huang and Steinmetz, he reported that musicians, particularly those with absolute pitch, showed stronger leftward asymmetry of the planum temporale than non-musicians.

=== Brain-based individual identification ===
Jäncke and co-workers showed that individuals can be identified from their brain measurements, a form of "brain fingerprinting". A 2018 study in Scientific Reports identified individuals with high accuracy from anatomical MRI features, and a follow-up demonstrated that people could still be recognised from neuroanatomical measurements taken seven years earlier. Related work reported comparable identification accuracy from short segments of resting-state EEG activity.

== Awards and honours ==
Jäncke received the Credit Suisse Award for Best Teaching from the University of Zurich in 2007, with a further teaching award from the university in 2011, and the "Goldene Eule" (Golden Owl) student teaching prize from ETH Zurich in 2006 and 2008. In November 2024 the University of Lucerne awarded him an honorary doctorate for his contributions to neuropsychology.

== Selected publications ==
=== Books ===
- Methoden der Bildgebung in der Psychologie und den kognitiven Neurowissenschaften. Kohlhammer, Stuttgart 2005.
- with Bärbel Hüsing, Brigitte Tag: Impact Assessment of Neuroimaging. Vdf Hochschulverlag, Zürich 2006.doi:10.3929/ethz-a-005172268
- hrsg. mit Fred W. Mast: Spatial Processing in Navigation, Imagery and Perception. Springer, New York 2007.doi:10.1007/978-0-387-71978-8
- Macht Musik schlau? Neue Erkenntnisse aus den Neurowissenschaften und der kognitiven Psychologie. Huber, Bern 2008.ISBN 9783456845753
- Lehrbuch Kognitive Neurowissenschaften. Huber, Bern 2013.ISBN 978-3-456-95811-8
- Ist unser Hirn vernünftig? Erkenntnisse eines Neuropsychologen. Huber, Bern 2015.ISBN 9783456856537
- Mann und Frau: ein Auslaufmodell. Hogrefe, Göttingen 2025.ISBN 9783456864105
- Synapsen und Symphonien. Hogrefe, Göttingen 2026.ISBN 9783456864273
- Wenn Töne salzig schmecken. rüffer & rub, Zurich 2026.ISBN 978-3-907351-47-5
