= Friedrich Lutz =

Friedrich Lutz (22 February 1852 in Heidenheim – 14 May 1918 in Oettingen) was a German politician, Bavarian brewery owner, and farmer. He was mayor (bürgermeister) of Heidenheim, a member of the Bavarian Landtag and a member of the German Reichstag.

== Early life ==
Lutz was the son of the brewery owner Gerhard Andreas Lutz and his wife Margaret, née Müller. He attended a trade school and on 9 August 1881, he married Sophia Maria Herrmann from Heidenheim. By then he was the managing director of his parents' brewery business. He became involved in politics first as a member of the District Council Committee, then as Chairman of the District Agricultural Association. In 1885 Lutz was one of the founders and first chairman of the Central Franconian Peasant Association (Mittelfränkischen Bauernvereins), a conservative organization, but one which worked occasionally with the more liberal Bavarian Farmers' League (Bayerischen Bauernbund) on rural and agricultural issues. Lutz was a member of the Conservative Party (DKP) and the Agrarian League (Bund der Landwirte). In the 1890s, he was one of the main actors of the conservatively oriented Agrarian League.

== Political posts ==
From 1890 to 1898 he was a member of the German Reichstag for the electoral district of Middle Franconia 5 (Dinkelsbühl, Gunzenhausen, and Feuchtwangen). From 1887 to 1905 he was also a Conservative Party member in the Landtag of Bavaria (Bavarian Assembly), from the constituency of Nördlingen in Swabia. Beginning with the 1902 election, Lutz sought and gained the support of the Bavarian Farmers' League. In 1904 Lutz broke with the Conservative Party leadership over the issue of electoral reform for the Bavarian Landtag. In the state elections in 1905 he ran as a Centre Party member with Bavarian Farmers' League support, but lost. He retired for a few years from the business of politics. In 1912 Lutz returned to politics and ran for the Nordlingen seat in the Bavarian Landtag with the support of the Bavarian Farmers' League. He retained that seat until his death in 1918.

== Policies and philosophy ==
Lutz was of the view that the emerging commodity and futures markets operated at the expense of farmers and the middle class and therefore called for a tax on such activity in order to decease its incidence. He also supported protectionist import tariffs, and increased inspection and quality controls on import food stuffs.

Lutz also took an antisemitic position consistent with his roots. A frequent target of his antisemitic verbal attacks was the department store owner Oscar Tietz. Among other things, Lutz called for a boycott of Jewish businesses.

== Life's end ==
About 1912 Lutz sold the brewery in Heidenheim and moved to Oettingen, where he died 14 May 1918.
