= Venom optimization hypothesis =

Idea that animals regulate venom production

Venom optimization hypothesis, also known as venom metering, is a biological hypothesis which postulates that venomous animals have physiological control over their production and use of venoms. It explains the economic use of venom because venom is a metabolically expensive product, and that there is a biological mechanism for controlling their specific use. The hypothetical concept was proposed by Esther Wigger, Lucia Kuhn-Nentwig, and Wolfgang Nentwig of the Zoological Institute at the University of Bern, Switzerland, in 2002.

A number of venomous animals have been experimentally found to regulate the amount of venom they use during predation or defensive situations. Species of anemones, jellyfish, ants, scorpions, spiders, and snakes are found to use their venoms frugally depending on the situation and size of their preys or predators.

== Development ==
Venom optimization hypothesis was postulated by Wigger, Kuhn-Nentwig, and Nentwig from their studies of the amount of venom used by a wandering spider Cupiennius salei. This spider produces a neurotoxic peptide called CsTx-1 for paralysing its prey. It does not weave webs for trapping preys, and therefore, entirely depends on its venom for predation. It is known to prey on a variety of insects including butterflies, moths, earwigs, cockroaches, flies and grasshoppers. Its venom glands store only about 10 μl of crude venom. Refilling of the glands takes 2–3 days and the lethal efficacy of the venom is, initially, very low for several days, requiring 8 to 18 days for full effect. It was found that the amount of venom released differed for each specific prey. For example, for bigger and stronger insects like beetles, the spider uses the entire amount of its venom; while for small ones, it uses only a small amount, thus economizing its costly venom. In fact, experiments show that the amount of venom released is just sufficient (at the lethal dose) to paralyze the target organism depending on the size or strength, and is not more than what is necessary.

== Concept ==
Animal venoms are complex biomolecules and hence, their biological synthesis require high metabolic activity. A particular venom itself is a complex chemical mixture composed of hundreds of proteins and non-proteinaceous compounds, resulting in a potent weapon for prey immobilization and predator deterrence. The metabolic cost of venom is sufficiently high to result in secondary loss of venom whenever its use becomes non-essential to survival of the animal. This suggests that venomous animals may have evolved strategies for minimizing venom expenditure, that they should use them only as and when required, and that too in optimal amount.
