= Social market economy =

Socio-economic model

The social market economy (SOME; German: soziale Marktwirtschaft, German pronunciation: [zoˌt͡si̯aːlə ˈmaʁktˌvɪʁtʃaft]), also called Rhine capitalism, Rhine-Alpine capitalism, the Rhenish model, and social capitalism, is a socioeconomic model and ideology combining a free-market capitalist economic system with social policies and enough regulation to establish both fair competition within the market and generally a welfare state. It is sometimes classified as a regulated market economy. The social market economy was originally promoted and implemented in West Germany by the Christian Democratic Union under Chancellor Konrad Adenauer in 1949 and today it is used by ordoliberals, social liberals and social democrats. Its origins can be traced to the interwar Freiburg school of economic thought.

The social market economy was designed to be a middle way between laissez-faire forms of capitalism and socialist economics. It was strongly inspired by ordoliberalism, which was influenced by the political ideology of Christian democracy. It refrains from attempts to plan and guide production, the workforce, or sales but supports planned efforts to influence the economy through the organic means of a comprehensive economic policy coupled with flexible adaptation to market studies. Combining monetary, credit, trade, tax, customs, investment, and social policies, as well as other measures, this type of economic policy aims to create an economy that serves the welfare and needs of the entire population.

The social segment is often wrongly confused with socialism by right-wing critics. Although aspects were inspired by democratic socialism and social democracy, the social market approach rejects the communist ideas of replacing private property and markets with social ownership and economic planning. The social element of the model instead refers to support for the provision of equal opportunity and protection of those unable to enter the market labor force because of old age, disability, or unemployment.

Some authors use the term social capitalism with roughly the same meaning as social market economy. It is also called "Rhine capitalism", typically when contrasting it with the Anglo-Saxon model of capitalism. Rather than seeing it as an antithesis, some authors describe Rhine capitalism as a successful synthesis of the Anglo-American model with social democracy. The German model is contrasted and compared with other economic models, some of which are also described as middle ways or regional forms of capitalism, including Tony Blair's Third Way, French dirigisme, the Dutch polder model, the Nordic model, Japanese - Korean - Taiwanese corporate East Asian model of capitalism, and the contemporary Chinese socialist market economy. A 2012 comparative politics textbook distinguishes between the "conservative–corporatist welfare state" (arising from the German social market economy) and the "labor-led social democratic welfare state". The concept of the model has since been expanded upon into the idea of an eco-social market economy as not only taking into account the social responsibility of humanity but also the sustainable use and protection of natural resources.

Countries with a social market economy include Andorra, Austria, Belgium, France, Germany, Italy, Liechtenstein, Ukraine, Luxembourg, Monaco, Netherlands and Switzerland.

== Model ==
Social market economies aim to combine free initiative and social welfare on the basis of a competitive economy. The social market economy is opposed to laissez-faire policies and to socialist economic systems, and combines private enterprise with regulation and state intervention to establish fair competition, maintaining a balance between a high rate of economic growth, low inflation, low levels of unemployment, good working conditions, social welfare and public services. The term "social" was established by Adenauer to prevent further reference to Christian socialism, which was used in the early party agenda Ahlener Programm in 1947.

Although the social market economy model evolved from ordoliberalism, this concept was not identical with the conception of the Freiburg school as it emphasized the state's responsibility to work actively to improve the market condition and simultaneously to pursue a social balance. In contrast to Walter Eucken, who sought an answer to the social question by establishing a functioning competitive order within a constitutional framework, Alfred Müller-Armack conceived the social market economy as a regulatory policy idea aiming to combine free enterprise with a social program that is underpinned by market economic performance. In putting social policy on par with economic policy, Müller-Armack's concept was more emphatic regarding socio-political aims than the ordoliberal economic concept. This dual principle also appeared in the name of the model. Although the adjective "social" often attracted criticism as a decorative fig leaf or conversely as a gateway for antiliberal interventionism, it meant more than simply distinguishing the concept from that of laissez-faire capitalism on the one side and of ordoliberal conceptions on the other.

In drawing on Wilhelm Röpke's anthropo-sociological approach of an economic humanism leading to a Civitas Humana, Müller-Armack pursued a "Social Humanism" or "Social Irenics"—the notion irenics derives from the Greek eirēnē (εἰρήνη), which means being conducive to or working toward peace, moderation or conciliation—to overcome existing differences in society. The social market economy as an extension of neoliberal thought was not a defined economic order but a holistic conception pursuing a complete humanistic societal order as a synthesis of seemingly conflicting objectives, namely economic freedom and social security. This socio-economic imperative actively managed by a strong state—in contrast to the ordoliberal minimal state solely safeguarding the economic order—is often labelled by the ambiguous but historical term Der Dritte Weg ("The Third Way").

The concept of the social market economy received fundamental impulses from reflection and critique of historical economic and social orders, namely Smithian laissez-faire liberalism on the one hand and Marxian socialism on the other. Furthermore, various Third Way conceptions prepared the ground for the socio-economic concept. Already in the late 19th century, the Kathedersozialisten ("Catheder Socialists") engaged in social reforms in the Verein für Socialpolitik, turning away from pure liberalism to demand a purposive state policy designed to regulate economic life and advocating a middle course between anarchic individualism, traditionalistic corporatism and bureaucratic statism.

In the early 20th century, the Frankfurt sociologist and economist Franz Oppenheimer postulated a so-called liberal socialism (i.e. socialism achieved via liberalism) as the pursuit of a societal order in which economic self-interest preserves its power and persists in free competition. This desirable order of freedom and equality was labelled by a later programmatic publication entitled Weder so – noch so. Der dritte Weg (Neither thus, nor thus. The third way). This position was widely shared by Oppenheimer's doctoral student and friend Ludwig Erhard, though the latter displaced adjective and subject by promoting a social liberalism, and he never liked the expression Third Way. In his opinion, the term was tainted, reminding him too much about ideas of a mixed economy, somewhere between a market economy and central planning. He vehemently and consistently argued against the view that models were converging. Further in contrast to Müller-Armack who emphasised the social aspect, for Erhard the social market economy was always first and foremost a market economic system. By proclaiming "the freer an economy is, the more social it is", Erhard once told Friedrich Hayek that the freemarket economy did not need to be made social but that it was social in its origin. Erhard was rather inclined to Walter Eucken's ordoliberal competitive market order. Although he even considered himself an ordoliberal, Erhard based his economic conception neither on Eucken nor on Müller-Armack. In fact, his doctoral supervisor Oppenheimer and especially Röpke, like Erhard a student of Oppenheimer, was his source of inspiration. Erhard perceived Röpke's books as works of revelation and considered the economist a brother in spirit.

On 17 August 1948, Erhard referred to Müller-Armack by whom he was strongly impressed most of all not as a theorist but as one who wanted to transfer theory into practice, as well as his concept of the social market economy. Soon after, at the second party congress of the Christian Democratic Union of Germany (CDU) in the British zone in Recklinghausen on 28 August 1948, Erhard circumscribed the concept as a "socially committed market economy". Whereas most neoliberal economists viewed the concept not only as an economic path between the Scylla of an untamed pure laissez-faire capitalism and the Charybdis of a collectivist planned economy but also as a holistic and democratic social order, Erhard and in particular Müller-Armack emphasised public acceptance and civic engagement as prerequisites for the success of the socio-economic model. For instance, Müller-Armack stressed that by "more socialism" he meant the social engagement for and with the people. Equally, Erhard pointed out that the principles of the social market economy could only be achieved if the public was determined to give them priority.

Important figures in the development of the concept include Eucken, Röpke, Alexander Rüstow, Franz Böhm, Oppenheimer, Erhard, Constantin von Dietze and Müller-Armack, who originally coined the term Soziale Marktwirtschaft. They share an involvement in the Anti-Nazi Opposition, whose search for a post-Nazi order for Germany is an important background for the development of this concept. Early protagonists had close contacts to the oppositional church-movement Bekennende Kirche and Dietrich Bonhoeffer and emphasized the reference of their concept to Catholic and Protestant social ethics.

=== Rhine capitalism ===
Economist Michel Albert described a similar concept, "Rhine capitalism". He compared the so-called "neo-American model" of a capitalistic market economy introduced by the administrations of Ronald Reagan and Margaret Thatcher with what he called Rhine capitalism, present in Germany, France and in some of the Northern European economies.

While the neo-American model builds largely on the ideas of Friedrich von Hayek and Milton Friedman, Rhine capitalism according to Albert has its foundations on publicly organized social security. Albert analyzes the Rhenish model as the more equitable, efficient and less violent one. However, according to Albert complex psychological phenomena and the functioning of the press lets the American model appear more attractive and dynamic to the general public.

=== Social capitalism model ===
Social capitalism as a theory or political or philosophical stance challenges the idea that the capitalist system is inherently antagonistic to social goals or to a political economy characterized by greater economic equality. The essence of the social market economy is the view that private markets are the most effective allocation mechanism, but that output is maximized through sound state macroeconomic management of the economy. Social market economies posit that a strong social support network for the less affluent enhances capital output. By decreasing poverty and broadening prosperity to a large middle class, capital market participation is enlarged. Social market economies also posit that government regulation and even sponsorship of markets can lead to superior economic outcomes as evidenced in government sponsorship of the Internet or basic securities regulation.

=== Main elements ===
The main elements of the social market economy in Germany are the following:

- The social market contains central elements of a free market economy such as private property, free foreign trade, exchange of goods and free formation of prices.
- In contrast to the situation in a free market economy, the state is not passive and actively implements regulative measures. Some elements such as pension insurance, universal health care and unemployment insurance are part of the social security system. These insurances are funded by a combination of employee contributions, employer contributions and government subsidies. The social policy objectives include employment, housing and education policies as well as a socio-politically motivated balancing of the distribution of income growth. In addition, there are provisions to restrain the free market (e.g. antitrust code, laws against the abuse of market power and so on). These elements help to diminish many of the occurring problems of a free market economy.

== History ==
=== Germany ===
The social market economy was born and formed in times of severe economic but equally socio-political crises. Its conceptual architecture was set by particular historical experiences and political prerequisites: Germany's preoccupation with the social question since the late 19th century, the criticism of liberal capitalism triggered by the world economic crisis of the early 1930s and a pronounced anti-totalitarianism as well as anti-collectivism formed by the experiences of the Third Reich. These led to the eventual development of the social market economy as a viable socio-political and economic alternative between the extremes of laissez-faire capitalism and the collectivist planned economy not as a compromise but as a combination of seemingly conflicting objectives namely greater state provision for social security and the preservation of individual freedom.

One of the major factors for the emergence of the German model of capitalism was to ameliorate the conditions of workers under capitalism and thus to stave off the threat of Karl Marx's militant socialist movement. Germany implemented the world's first welfare state and universal healthcare program in the 1880s. Chancellor Otto von Bismarck developed a program in which industry and state work closely to stimulate economic growth by giving workers greater security. To trump the militant socialists, Bismarck gave workers a corporate status in the legal and political structures of the German Empire. In March 1884, Bismarck declared:

The real grievance of the worker is the insecurity of his existence; he is not sure that he will always have work, he is not sure that he will always be healthy, and he foresees that he will one day be old and unfit to work. If he falls into poverty, even if only through a prolonged illness, he is then completely helpless, left to his own devices, and society does not currently recognize any real obligation towards him beyond the usual help for the poor, even if he has been working all the time ever so faithfully and diligently. The usual help for the poor, however, leaves a lot to be desired, especially in large cities, where it is very much worse than in the country.

Bismarck's program centered squarely on providing universal social insurance programs designed to increase productivity and focus the political attentions of the German workers on supporting Kaiser Wilhelm I. The program included universal healthcare, compulsory education, sickness insurance, accident insurance, disability insurance and a retirement pension, none of which were then in existence to any great degree anywhere else in the world.

After the collapse of the totalitarian Third Reich with its statist and corporatist economic policy, economists and academics at the University of Freiburg im Breisgau in Germany advocated a neoliberal or new liberal and socio-economic order. In this context, it is important to distinguish between the ordoliberal Freiburg school (or Freiburg school of law and economics) and the Freiburg Circles. Frequently, the two schools of thought were believed to be the same, although the first emerged from the latter and among the members of the Freiburg school only the founders Walter Eucken and Franz Böhm belonged to the Freiburg Circles and conversely no member of the Freiburg Circles can be attributed to the Freiburg school, which partly advocated different economic objectives. Both schools of economic thought considered that a certain form of planning was necessary for a transitional period following the war. However, whereas the pivotal members of the Freiburg Circles, Erwin von Beckerath, Adolf Lampe and Jens Jessen, favoured productive governmental intervention, i.e. an economy regulated by a relatively strong state, Eucken, Böhm and Constantin von Dietze believed in self-regulating market forces and limited indirect state interference.

In drawing on both Eucken's ordoliberal competitive order and Wilhelm Röpke's economic humanism leading to a "Civitas Humana", the ordoliberal competitive order was further developed by the Cologne school around the economist and anthropologist Alfred Müller-Armack, who therefore coined the term Soziale Marktwirtschaft ("social market economy") in a publication in December 1946. Although it evolved from ordoliberalism as a new variant of neoliberalism, this concept was not identical with the conception of the Freiburg school. In contrast to Eucken, who favoured a strictly procedural or rule-oriented liberalism in which the state solely sets the institutional framework and abstains generally from interference in the market, Müller-Armack emphasised the state's responsibility actively to improve the market condition and simultaneously to pursue a social balance. In putting social policy on a par with economic policy, Müller-Armack's concept was more emphatic regarding socio-political aims than the ordoliberal economic concept. As an extension of neoliberal thought, the social market economy was deliberately not a defined economic order but an adjustable holistic conception pursuing a complete humanistic societal order as a synthesis of seemingly conflicting objectives, namely economic freedom and social security. Although it is often viewed as a mélange of socio-political ideas rather than a precisely outlined theoretical order, the conception possessed an effective slogan, which facilitated its communication to both politics and the public. However, the eventual implementation required not only communication but also political backup.

Müller-Armack's concept soon met with the conception of the then Chairman of the Sonderstelle Geld und Kredit (Special Bureau for Money and Credit) within the Administration for Finance, i.e. an expert commission preparing the currency reform in the then Anglo-American Bizone, Ludwig Erhard. Although Erhard was rather inclined to Eucken's ordoliberal competitive market order and even considered himself an ordoliberal, he was strongly impressed by Müller-Armack most of all not as a theorist but as one who wanted to transfer theory into practice.

When Erhard succeeded Johannes Semmler as Director of the Administration for Economics in the Bizonal Economic Council on 2 March 1948, the social market economy entered the political sphere. Soon after on 21 April 1948, Erhard informed the parliament about his economic policy and introduced the concept of the social market economy. Although there was no unanimous applause, both the liberal democrats and conservatives widely welcomed the transition to a more market-oriented economy. Konrad Adenauer, the chairman of the CDU in the British zone of occupation, invited Erhard to also inform the party members about his socio-economic conception at the party convention in Recklinghausen, Germany on 28 August 1948. In a visionary and stirring speech, entitled Marktwirtschaft im Streit der Meinungen ("Market Economy in Dispute"), Erhard defended his concept of the social market economy alluding to the dualism between a controlled economy and a market economy. In view of the upcoming regional and federal elections, Adenauer, who was initially sceptical about Erhard, was not only impressed by the polarising slogan, such as "Controlled or Market Economy", but also by the efficacy of Erhard and his programme. The foundation for a successful political alliance was laid.

Chancellor Adenauer of the ruling CDU implemented a new novel economic order amalgamating the promotion of free competition with the responsibility of the social government. The Wirtschaftswunder or economic miracle of West Germany could not have been brought about without secure social peace in the country. Adenauer's program centered on legislation establishing co-determination in the coal and steel industry, the system of employee property formation, the equalization of burdens, the creation of subsidized housing, child benefits, the agricultural Green Plan and the dynamism of pensions. On 20 June 1948, the principles of the social market economy espoused by the CDU became the foundation of modern German economic policy:

The "social market economy" is the socially anchored law for the industrial economy, according to which the achievements of free and able individuals are integrated into a system that produces the highest level of economic benefit and social justice for all. This system is created by freedom and responsibility, which find expression in the "social market economy" through genuine performance-based competition and the independent control of monopolies. Genuine performance-based competition exists when the rules of competition ensure that, under conditions of fair competition and equal opportunity, the better performance is rewarded. Market-driven prices regulate the interaction between all market participants.

After the Christian Social Union in Bavaria (CSU) also expressed its commitment to a market economy with social balance and the then newly elected Bavarian Minister for Economic Affairs Hanns Seidel advocated Erhard's liberal and social economic model at the CSU's party convention in Straubing in May 1949, the economic principles elaborated by the Working Committee of the CDU/CSU as liaison body and information centre of the two political parties commonly referred to as the "Union", centred the social market economy. Finally, these principles were adopted as party platform and manifesto for the upcoming federal elections at the CDU's party conference in Düsseldorf on 15 July 1949. In contrast to the previous ideological Ahlener Programm suggesting a rather abstract and anti-materialist Gemeinwirtschaft, theseDüsseldorfer Leitsätze not only provided a concrete, pragmatic and materialist economic programme but also an attractive slogan to reach consensus within the party and the public. While eventually the union of the two recently established political parties (i.e. the CDU and the CSU) possessed a coherent and unifying economic programme enabling a more consistent public front, the oldest German political party, the Social Democratic Party (SPD), led by the advocate of economic planning and extensive socialisation Kurt Schumacher, did not introduce its own economic concept. This not only complicated the parliamentary work of the party in the Economic Council but also limited the public relations of the party as a whole, especially in times of campaigning where the partially complex political programmes were simplified and popularised.

In the run-up to the federal elections in August 1949, the CDU/CSU consequently aligned their party platforms, policies and manifestos and campaigned with the social market economy. In particular, the former advertising manager for consumer goods Ludwig Erhard, who affirmed that he would "go into the upcoming political party clashes with particular energy for the CDU", realised the potential of subtle and systematic marketing to transform the concept from an economic theory, or even abstract economic policy, into the basis of a political party's propaganda and public image that held broad appeal. Eventually, on Sunday 14 August 1949 around 31 million Germans were called to cast a vote for the first German Bundestag and to decide between the social market economy and a controlled economy advocated by the SPD. Of those eligible to vote, 25 million or 78.5 per cent actually went to the ballot boxes and showed a clear commitment to the emerging post-war democracy.

Although the SPD turned out to be the most successful single party by gaining 29.12 per cent of the votes, the CDU/CSU combined attracted more votes, totalling 31 per cent and 139 mandates compared to 131 for the SPD. However, in fact both Volksparteien had suffered large percentage losses over their previous Land election totals by failing to capture a comparable share of the enlarged electorate. The most remarkable advance by winning over a million extra votes and achieving 11.9 per cent of the total votes was that made by the liberal Free Democratic Party (FDP) led by the chairman Theodor Heuss. The economically liberal FDP were in fact the only political party consistently gaining percentage of votes between 1946 and 1949. While these results affirmed the then general pro-market trend in public opinion, eventually, the electorate made its decision contingent on the satisfaction of its practical needs rather than on any particular theoretical economic system. The advantage of the CDU and the CSU lay precisely in the fact that they were quasi-governing across the Bizone and thus increasingly identified with the economic recovery and the improving economic conditions. Although the implementation of the social market economy benefited also from other crucial factors, including the east–west conflict and a favourable political and social climate within Germany and abroad, the stabilising alliance between the conservative and liberal parties, the pro-market composition of the Economic Council and even the Federal Republic's own Grundgesetz (Basic Law), which stressed individual freedom, human dignity and the subsidiarity of societal organisation, it was also the consistent efforts at political communication of the cooperative and corporate model that led to the implementation and eventual electoral validation of the social market economy in post-war West Germany.

At first controversial, the model became increasingly popular in West Germany and Austria since in both states economic success (Wirtschaftswunder) was identified with it. From the 1960s, the social market economy was the main economic model in mainland Western Europe, pursued by administrations of both the centre-right (led by the CDU/CSU) and the centre-left (led by the SPD). The concept of the social market economy is still the common economic basis of major political parties in Germany including the CDU, FDP, and SPD, and a commitment to some form of social market economy is present in Article 3 of the Treaty on European Union.

=== United Kingdom ===
In the United Kingdom, the concept of the social market economy was first introduced by the Conservative politician Keith Joseph. Following World War II, the main political parties agreed on the nationalization of industry and close economic regulation. In the 1970s, Joseph introduced the idea as an alternative to the post-war consensus allowing free markets for competition and innovation whilst the role of government was to help hold the ring, provide infrastructure, maintain a stable currency, a framework of laws, implementation of law and order, provision of a safety net (welfare state), defence of property rights and all other rights involved in the economic process. Throughout his political career, Joseph used his position to restate the principles of the social market economy and re-direct Conservative policy in Britain. Joseph eventually set up a think tank in 1974 to study the model and initially called it the Ludwig Erhard Foundation and Institute for a Social Market Economy before settling on the name Centre for Policy Studies.

=== European Union ===
The Treaty on European Union set the following goals in Article 3(3):

The Union shall establish an internal market. It shall work for the sustainable development of Europe based on balanced economic growth and price stability, a highly competitive social market economy, aiming at full employment and social progress, and a high level of protection and improvement of the quality of the environment. It shall promote scientific and technological advance.

== Misconceptions ==
Although one of the main factors for the emergence of the European model of capitalism was the attempt to ameliorate the conditions of workers under capitalism and thus stave off the emergence of socialism or socialist revolution, American critics and Eurosceptics identify the social market model with the notions of the welfare state and sometimes mistakenly identify it as being socialist.

== See also ==
- Crony capitalism
- Corporatism
- Libertarian socialism
- Market socialism
- Rehn–Meidner model
- Keynesian economics
- Neoclassical economics
- Market failure
- Market economy
- Market structure
- Median income
- Monopoly
- Mixed economy
- Social corporatism
- Tripartism
- Types of capitalism
- Welfare capitalism
- Humanistic economics
- Planned economy

== Sources ==
- Abelshauser, Werner (2004). Deutsche Wirtschaftsgeschichte: seit 1945. C. H. Beck. ISBN 978-3-406-51094-6.
- Koppstein, Jeffrey; Lichbach, Mark Irving (2005), Comparative Politics: Interests, Identities, And Institutions In A Changing Global Order, Cambridge University Press, ISBN 0-521-60395-1.
- Spicka, Mark E. (2007). Selling the Economic Miracle: Reconstruction and Politics in West Germany. Berghahn Books. ISBN 978-1-84545-223-0.
