= Anglo-Saxon model =

Variant of capitalism supposedly developed in the US and UK

The Anglo-Saxon model (so called because it is practiced in Anglosphere countries such as the United Kingdom, the United States, Canada, New Zealand, Australia and Ireland) is a regulated market-based economic model that emerged in the 1970s.

Based on the Chicago school of economics, it was spearheaded in the 1980s in the United States by the economics of then President Ronald Reagan (dubbed Reaganomics), and reinforced in the United Kingdom by then Prime Minister Margaret Thatcher (dubbed Thatcherism).

Characteristics of this model include low levels of regulation and taxation, with the public sector providing minimal services. It emphasises strong private property rights, contract enforcement, and overall ease of doing business as well as low barriers to free trade.

== Disagreements over meaning ==
Proponents of the term "Anglo-Saxon economy" argue that the economies of these countries currently are so closely related in their liberal and free market orientation that they can be regarded as sharing a specific macroeconomic model. However, those who disagree with the use of the term claim that the economies of these countries differ as much from each other as they do from the so-called "welfare capitalist" economies of northern and continental Europe.

The Anglo-Saxon model of capitalism is usually contrasted with the Continental model of capitalism, known as Rhine capitalism, the social market economy or the German model. It is also contrasted with Northern-European models of capitalism found in the Nordic countries, known as the Nordic model. The major difference between these economies from Anglo-Saxon economies is the scope of collective bargaining rights and corporatist policies.

Differences between Anglo-Saxon economies are illustrated by taxation and the welfare state. The United Kingdom has a significantly higher level of taxation than the United States. The United Kingdom spends far more than the United States on the welfare state as a percentage of GDP and spends more than Spain, Portugal, or the Netherlands. This spending figure is still considerably lower than that of France or Germany.

In northern continental Europe, most countries use mixed economy models, called Rhine capitalism, a current term used especially for the macroeconomics of Germany, France, Belgium and the Netherlands, or its close relative the Nordic model, which refers to the macroeconomics of Denmark, Iceland, Norway, Sweden and Finland.

The debate amongst economists as to which economic model is better, circles around perspectives involving poverty, job insecurity, social services and inequality. Generally speaking, advocates of Anglo-Saxon model argue that more liberalized economies produce greater overall prosperity while defenders of continental models counter that they produce lesser inequality and lesser poverty at the lowest margins.

The rise of China has brought into focus the relevance of an alternate economic model which has helped propel the economy of China for thirty years since its opening up in 1978. The socialist market economy or a system based on what is called "socialism with Chinese characteristics". A confident China is increasingly offering it as an alternate development model to the Anglo-Saxon model to emerging economies in Africa and Asia.

== History of the Anglo-Saxon model ==
The Anglo-Saxon model came out in the 1970s from the Chicago School of Economics. The return to economic liberalism in the Anglo-Saxon countries is explained by the failure of Keynesian economic management to control the stagflation in the 1970s and early 1980s. The Anglo-Saxon model was made from the ideas of Friedman and the Chicago School economists and the conventional wisdom of pre-Keynesian, liberal economic ideas which stated that fighting inflation depends on managing the money supply whilst increasing efficiency in the use of resources and that unrestricted markets are the best way to achieve this.

By the end of the 1970s the British post-war economic model was in trouble. After Labour failed to solve the problems it was left to Margaret Thatcher's Conservatives to reverse Britain's economic decline. During Thatcher's second term the British economy and its society started to change. Marketization, privatization and the deliberate diminishing of the remnants of the post-war social-democratic model were all affected by the American ideas.

The Thatcher era revived British social and economic thinking. It did not entail wholesale import of American ideas and practices, so the British shift to the right did not cause the any real convergence toward American socio-economic norms. However, with time the British approach, that European economies should be inspired by the success of the United States, built an ideological proximity with the United States. After a process of transferring policy from the United States, it became apparent that a distinctive Anglo-Saxon economic model was forming.

== Types of Anglo-Saxon economic models ==
According to some researchers, not all liberal economics models are created equally. There are different sub-types and variations among countries that practice Anglo-Saxon model. One of these variations is neo-classical economic liberalism exhibited in American and British economies. The underlying assumption of this variation is that the inherent selfishness of individuals is transferred by the self-regulating market into general economic well-being, known as the invisible hand. In neo-classical economic liberalism, competitive markets should function as equilibrating mechanisms, which deliver both economic welfare and distributive justice. One of the main aims of the economic liberalism in the United States and United Kingdom, which was significantly influenced by Friedrich Hayek's ideas, is that government should regulate economic activity; but the state should not get involved as economic actor.

The other variation of economic liberalism is "balanced model" or ‘ordoliberalism’ (the concept is from the concept of ‘ordo’, the Latin word for ‘order’). Ordoliberalism means an ideal economic system which would be more well ordered than the laissez-faire economy supported by classical liberals. After the 1929 Stock Market Crash and Great Depression, the German Freiburg School's intellectuals argued that to ensure that market functions effectively, government should undertake an active role, backed by a strong legal system and suitable regulatory framework. They claimed that without strong government private interests would undercut competition in the system which is characterized by differences in relative power.

Ordoliberals thought that liberalism (the freedom of individuals to compete in markets) and laissez-faire (the freedom of markets from government intervention) should be separated. Walter Eucken, the founding father and one of the most influential representatives of the Freiburg School, condemned classical laissez-faire liberalism for its ‘naturalistic naivety.’ Eucken states that the market and competition can only exist if economic order is created by a strong state. The power of government should be clearly determined, but in its area in which the state plays a role, the state has to be active and powerful. For ordoliberals, the right kind of government is the solution of the problem. Alexander Rüstow claimed that government should refrain from getting too engaged in markets. He was against protectionism, subsidies or cartels. However, he suggested limited interventionism should be allowed as long as it went "in the direction of the market’s laws." Another difference between two variations is that ordoliberals saw the main enemy of free society in monopolies instead of the state.

It is hard to empirically show a direct influence of the history of ordoliberalism on Australia or Canada. However, economic liberalism in Australia and Canada resembles German ordoliberalism much more than neo-classical liberalism of the US and UK. Differing interpretations of the Anglo-Saxon economic school of thought and, especially different justifications and perceptions of state intervention in the economy, led to policy differences within these countries. Then these policies continued and influenced the relationship between the public and private sectors. For example, in the United States, the state enforces notably lower tax rates than in the United Kingdom. In addition, the government of the United Kingdom invests more money proportionately on welfare programs and social services than the government of the United States.

== See also ==
- American School
- Bretton Woods system
- Economic liberalism
- Free market
- German model
- Nordic model
- Protestant work ethic
- Social market economy
- Types of capitalism
- Varieties of Capitalism
- Austrian School
- Classical economics

== Bibliography ==
- Reginald Dale (1999-11-26). "Japan Is Transforming Its Economy". Thinking Ahead / Commentary. International Herald Tribune.
- Joerges, Christian; Strath, Bo; Wagner, Peter (2005). The Economy as a Polity: The Political Constitution of Contemporary Capitalism. Routledge Cavendish. p. 227. ISBN 978-1-84472-070-5.
- Mitchell, William; Muysken, Joan; Van Veen, Tom; Centre of Full Employment and Equity (2006). Growth and cohesion in the European Union: The Impact of Macroeconomic Policy. Edward Elgar Publishing. p. 250. ISBN 978-1-84542-611-8.
- Jurgen Reinhoudt (2007-10-29). "Showtime for Sarkozy". Economic Policy. The American. Archived from the original on 2009-02-14.
- Richter, Eberhard; Fuchs, Ruth (2003-11-15). "Rhine Capitalism, Anglo-Saxon Capitalism and Redistribution" (Excerpt, English translation of German original). The Future of Social Security Systems (Conference). Indymedia UK.
- Sapir, André (June 2006). "Globalization and the Reform of European Social Models". JCMS: Journal of Common Market Studies. 44 (2): 369–390. doi:10.1111/j.1468-5965.2006.00627.x. S2CID 54527430. Archived from the original on 2013-03-18.
- Steve Schifferes (2005-06-02). "Blow to EU economic reform hopes". Business. BBC News.
