= Funemployed =

Funemployed is a portmanteau of fun and unemployed, see Funemployment. It may refer to:

- Funemployed (web series)
- Funemployed (EP), a 2013 EP by Gnarwolves
- Funemployed (book), a book and album by Justin Heazlewood
