= Employee funds =

Collective shareholding funds in Sweden (1980s–1990s)

Employee funds (Swedish: Löntagarfonder), sometimes referred to as Wage Earner funds, is a socialist version of sovereign wealth funds whereby the Swedish government taxed a proportion of company profits and put into special funds charged to buy shares in listed Swedish companies, with the goal of gradually transferring ownership in medium to large companies from private to collective employee ownership. The funds were controlled by representatives of Swedish trade unions.

After abolition, the accumulated assets were wound up and redistributed through a liquidation process and new institutions created during the dismantling period.

The idea was launched in the 1970s by the Swedish Social Democratic Party, and they were in place from 1982 to 1991. During the 2020 United States presidential election, the candidate Bernie Sanders proposed for employee funds to be adopted in the United States.

== Meidner Plan ==
The plan to establish employee funds was introduced as the Wage Earners Funds Proposal, also known as the Meidner plan. It was first proposed in 1975 by the Swedish Trade Union Confederation (or the LO); a revised final draft was published in 1976. The Meidner plan gets its name from the LO economist Rudolf Meidner, who played a leading role in developing the idea and was the principal drafter of the plan.

In 1971, the Swedish Trade Union Confederation commissioned a research committee to address union concerns about wages and the state of the economy. Despite the solidarity wage policy in place at the time (known as the Rehn–Meidner model), the gap in income between capital and labour was growing; the country was also experiencing a wave of labour unrest over pay. In particular, the Federation of Metal Workers stressed that the problems of investment planning and capital formation needed to be resolved without increasing the concentration of power and wealth in the hands of a minority. The research committee was headed by Meidner and produced its first report in 1975.

== Legislation and design ==
After the Social Democrats returned to government following the 1982 Swedish general election, the Riksdag adopted legislation in November 1983 establishing wage-earner funds, which began operating in 1984. The government proposal created five wage-earner fund boards within the framework of the national pension fund system, with each board intended to have a regional basis and its own administrative capacity. The enacted scheme marked a shift away from earlier LO proposals based on compulsory transfers of newly issued shares, and instead relied on the funds purchasing shares on the market.

The funds were financed through two main revenue streams that were earmarked to the pension fund system. The first was a profit-sharing tax (vinstdelningsskatt), set at 20 per cent of firms' real profits above an exemption that was defined either as a fixed amount or as a proportion of the wage bill, at the firm's choice. The second was a designated portion of the supplementary pension contribution, which was increased by 0.2 percentage points from 1984 to fund the new boards. Revenues from profit sharing and from the contribution increase were split equally across the five wage-earner fund boards, subject to annual caps on allocations that applied from 1984 through 1990.

The legislation set financial objectives and reporting requirements. The government proposal required the wage-earner fund boards to transfer an annual return to the pension-paying boards, expressed as a target of real return on the managed capital. The OECD described the creation of wage-earner funds as part of a 1983–84 policy package that aimed to recycle corporate liquidity and support wage moderation.

=== The five fund boards ===
The funds were administered by five separate boards, designated the First to Fifth wage-earner fund boards, alongside the other boards in the AP fund system. Under the 1983 proposal, each wage-earner fund board was appointed by the government and consisted of nine members and deputies, with a requirement that at least five members represent wage-earner interests. The proposal stated that the boards' composition should reflect regional anchoring and that each board should operate independently with its own office.

Governance rules provided for union involvement in the exercise of voting rights. If local union organisations in a company requested it, a wage-earner fund board was required to transfer half of the voting rights attached to the board's shares in that company to those organisations.

Investment rules prioritised equities while limiting control. The government proposal stated that the boards were expected primarily to invest on the stock market, with a limited ability to provide risk capital to other organisational forms such as cooperatives. To limit corporate influence, a wage-earner fund board was barred from acquiring shares in a listed company if the purchase would bring its voting influence to 8 per cent or more. Pontusson and Kuruvilla argue that these constraints, along with the fixed end date for new revenue inflows, reduced the funds' long-term capacity to reshape ownership and corporate governance in the way envisaged by earlier proposals. Pontusson similarly argues that the limits constrained the scope of labour-initiated reforms in this period.

=== Timeline ===
- Mid-1970s: the wage-earner fund idea is developed within LO and becomes associated with the Meidner plan.
- November 1983: parliament adopts legislation establishing five wage-earner fund boards.
- 1984: the boards begin operating and start receiving earmarked revenue inflows, subject to caps in the 1983 scheme.
- 1991: a centre-right government introduces legislation to abolish the wage-earner funds and wind up the boards, and official reporting describes an annual allocation limit for the wage-earner funds in that year.
- 1992: parliament decides the distribution framework for the funds' assets and related liquidation arrangements.
- 1992 to 1994: the winding-up board Fond 92-94 manages the portfolios during liquidation.
- 1993: parliament approves using former wage-earner fund assets to capitalise new research foundations and related research funding arrangements.

== Operations, scale and performance ==
In 1991 the five wage-earner fund boards were Sydfonden, Fond Väst, Trefond Invest, Mellanfonden and Nordfonden. The original 1983 framework capped allocations through 1990, and later reporting described an annual allocation limit for 1991. In its review of the funds' final year of normal operation, the National Insurance Board reported that each wage-earner fund board except the fourth had requisitioned the full annual allocation limit for 1991, which was 3,452 million kronor per board.

=== Investment activity ===
The wage-earner funds invested primarily in listed Swedish equities and concentrated a large share of their capital in the most actively traded shares on the Stockholm Stock Exchange (Stockholmsbörsen). The National Audit Office reported that the fourth and fifth AP funds together with the wage-earner funds had placed 77 per cent of their combined capital on the stock exchange, corresponding to about 6 per cent of the exchange's total value, and that the purchases were mainly in the most traded shares. From 1 August 1991, amended investment rules allowed all fund boards to trade options, futures and similar financial instruments for portfolio management and risk control, but the National Audit Office noted that this was used only to a limited extent during 1991.

=== Scale ===
Official reporting provides inflation-adjusted end-of-year fund capital for the wage-earner funds, shown in the table below.

Real fund capital of the wage-earner funds (end of year, million SEK)
Fund	1988	1989	1990	1991
Sydfonden	3,242	4,546	3,917	4,290
Fond Väst	3,800	5,075	3,948	4,226
Trefond Invest	3,578	4,788	3,855	3,764
Mellanfonden	2,801	3,436	2,626	2,908
Nordfonden	3,584	5,048	4,091	4,104
Total	17,004	22,892	18,436	19,293

=== Returns and assessments ===
The wage-earner funds were required to preserve the purchasing power of their base capital and transfer a target real return to the main pension fund boards, and government evaluations treated performance against this requirement as a key benchmark. For 1991, the National Insurance Board reported that the wage-earner funds collectively fell short of the result requirement, and it also reported an accumulated shortfall of about 2.3 billion kronor over the 1984 to 1991 operating period, while noting that the measurement period coincided with large swings in stock-market performance. The National Audit Office reported that, from 1984, the wage-earner funds' return was about 5 per cent lower than a reference equity index used in its analysis, and that value growth to 1991 was estimated to be about 20 per cent lower than if the same resources had been placed in interest-bearing securities with the return achieved by the first to third AP funds.

Riksrevisionsverket reported that all wage-earner funds recorded a positive real change in 1991 after the large real decline in 1990, and it compared their results with the Stockholmsbörsen total index for the same period.

Real change in fund capital (percent)
Fund	1990	1991
Sydfonden	−21.5	+12.4
Fond Väst	−28.2	+10.0
Trefond Invest	−26.1	+0.9
Mellanfonden	−29.7	+6.7
Nordfonden	−25.3	+3.1
Stockholmsbörsen total index	−30.0	+8.4

By the time of abolition, the OECD estimated that the funds had accumulated assets worth about 20 billion kronor, and it argued that continued operation would have gradually increased trade-union influence in corporate control through their shareholdings.

== Implementation and reversal ==
Throughout their existence, they caused much political controversy. Proponents described them as an attempt to increase the power of labour over Swedish companies, and opponents described them as large step towards socialism.

They were introduced following the Social Democrat victory at the 1982 Swedish general election, and accumulated funds until they were abolished after a conservative victory in the 1991 general election. The accumulated wealth was transferred to two holding vehicles named Atle and Bure. Both vehicles were subsequently listed on the Stockholm Stock Exchange. On October 4, 1983, an anti-employee funds demonstration in Stockholm gathered between 80,000 and 100,000 participants. It was the largest political protest (in terms of numbers mobilised) to take place in Sweden from the liberal and right wing political block.

Subsequent Social Democrat victories, such as the one in 1994, did not lead to their reintroduction, as leading members of the party found the whole debate surrounding the funds a problem for the party. Famously, Minister of Finance Kjell-Olof Feldt was captured on camera while he was writing a negative poem about the funds in his bench in Parliament after they had been introduced.

== Legacy and later influence ==
After abolition, the former funds' assets were redistributed through three main channels: liquidation and redistribution through risk-capital structures, transfers supporting research funding via new foundations, and residual assets that remained within the AP fund system.

=== Liquidation and redistribution ===
After the abolition decision, the five wage-earner funds' assets were transferred to a dedicated winding-up board, Fond 92-94, which managed the portfolios from 1992 to 1994 and prepared a total distribution of the assets.

In 1992, the Riksdag decided that part of the former wage-earner funds' assets would be used to support small and medium-sized enterprises through risk-capital provision, including a transfer of 6.5 billion kronor to a risk-capital company structure. Subsequent decisions set out that the channelling of this capital would involve both portfolio-managing and direct-investing risk-capital companies, and that ownership of the resulting companies was intended to be distributed to firms that had paid the profit-sharing tax that financed the wage-earner funds. Government reporting later described two of the investment vehicles created during this redistribution as Atle and Bure Equity.

Westerberg argues that abolition and redistribution redirected former wage-earner fund assets into venture-capital vehicles and research foundations, and treats this shift as part of Sweden's early-1990s market turn.

=== Sixth AP Fund ===
In later government documents, Fond 92-94 was described as having been made permanent within the AP fund system and renamed the sixth fund board (sjätte fondstyrelsen). The Sixth Swedish National Pension Fund has described its initial capital as including remaining assets from the winding-up board that managed the wage-earner funds' portfolios. In descriptions of the pension reform process, the sixth and seventh fund boards were later renamed Sjätte AP-fonden and Sjunde AP-fonden. Government reviews have described the sixth fund as having a distinct mandate compared with the main buffer funds in the income pension system, with a stronger focus on unlisted investments.

=== Research foundations ===
A major part of the redistributed assets was used to establish and capitalise research foundations, including a group of strategic foundations established in the mid-1990s and intended to fund long-term research programmes outside annual budget appropriations. In 1993, parliament approved allocating about SEK 10 billion of former wage-earner fund assets for research, with most directed to strategic research and environmental research foundations and the remainder routed to humanities and social science research through arrangements linked to the Riksbank's Jubileumsfond. The Swedish National Agency for Higher Education described the research foundations established in 1994 with resources originating in the wage-earner funds as an important component of external research funding flows in the 1990s. Later evaluations have analysed these foundations' role in Swedish research and innovation policy, including questions of governance, priority-setting and additionality in relation to ordinary state research funding.

=== Continuing debate ===
Whyman argues that debate over wage-earner funds was shaped by claims that overstated their potential to transform ownership, while the enacted rules and caps limited their scope in practice. Furåker discusses the funds as a case study in economic-democracy reform and asks what lessons, if any, can be drawn for later debates about collective capital formation and employee influence. Warner examines how employer mobilisation affected the political conflict around wage-earner funds, and Westerberg treats the abolition and redistribution of the funds' assets as part of Sweden's early-1990s market turn.

== See also ==
- Economic democracy
- Meidner plan
- Swedish model
- Swedish Employers' Confederation
- Swedish Trade Union Confederation
