= Unemployment benefits =

Payments made by authorized bodies to unemployed people

Unemployment benefits, also called unemployment insurance, unemployment payment, unemployment compensation, or simply unemployment, are payments made by governmental bodies to unemployed people. Depending on the country and the status of the person, those sums may be small, covering only basic needs, or may compensate the lost time proportionally to the previous earned salary.

Unemployment benefits are generally given only to those registering as becoming unemployed through no fault of their own, and often on conditions ensuring that they seek work.

In British English, unemployment benefits are also colloquially referred to as "the dole", or simply "benefits"; receiving benefits is informally called "being on the dole". "Dole" here is an archaic expression meaning "one's allotted portion", from the synonymous Old English word dāl.

In Australia and New Zealand, a "dole bludger" is someone on unemployment benefits who makes no effort to find work. In the United Kingdom, the equivalent word used to describe the same thing is "layabout" and in the United States, "slacker" is most commonly used to describe someone who chooses not to work for a living.

== History ==
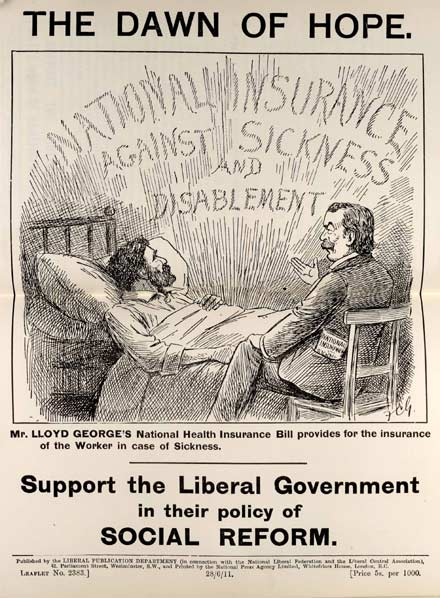
Leaflet promoting the National Insurance Act 1911

The first modern unemployment benefit scheme was introduced in the United Kingdom with the National Insurance Act 1911, under the Liberal Party government of H. H. Asquith. The popular measures were introduced to stave off poverty inflicted through unemployment, though they also gave the Liberal Party the added benefit of combatting the Labour Party's increasing influence among the country's working-class population. The Act gave the British working classes a contributory system of insurance against illness and unemployment. It only applied to wage earners, however, and their families and the unwaged had to rely on other sources of support, if any. Key figures in the implementation of the Act included Robert Laurie Morant and William Braithwaite.

By the time of its implementation, the benefits were criticised by Communist parties, who saw such insurance as a means to prevent workers from starting a revolution, while employers and Tories sometimes saw it as a "necessary evil".

The scheme was based on actuarial principles and was funded by fixed amounts from workers, employers, and taxpayers. It was restricted to particular industries, particularly more volatile ones like shipbuilding, and did not make provision for any dependants. After one week of unemployment, a worker was eligible to receive 7/- per week for up to 15 weeks in a year. By 1913, 2,300,000 were insured under the unemployment benefit programme.

The Unemployment Insurance Act 1920 created the dole system of payments for unemployed workers in the United Kingdom. The dole system provided 39 weeks of unemployment benefits to over 11,000,000 workers—practically the entire civilian working population except domestic service, farmworkers, railway men, and civil servants.

Unemployment benefits were introduced in Germany in 1927, and in most European countries in the period after the Second World War; with the expansion of the welfare state. Unemployment insurance in the United States originated in Wisconsin in 1932. Through the Social Security Act of 1935, the Federal government of the United States effectively encouraged the individual states to adopt unemployment insurance plans.

International Labour Organization has adopted the Employment Promotion and Protection against Unemployment Convention, 1988 for promotion of employment against unemployment and social security including unemployment benefit.

== Processes ==
Eligibility criteria for unemployment benefits typically factor in the applicant's employment history and their reason for being unemployed. Once approved, there is sometimes a waiting period before being able to receive benefits. In the US, there is a waiting period in many states. In Germany and Belgium, there is no waiting week. The current waiting period in Canada is seven days. Countries implement varied potential benefit duration (PBD), which is how long an individual is eligible to receive benefits. The PBD may be a sliding scale function of the applicant's past employment history and age, or it may be a set length for all applicants. In Argentina, for example, six months of work history results in a PBD of two months, while 36 months or more of work history can result in a PBD of a full year, with an extra six months of PBD to applicants over the age of 45.

Most countries calculate the amount of unemployment benefit as a percentage of the applicant's former income. A typical replacement percentage is 50–65%. Some countries offer much higher levels of wage replacement, such as the Netherlands (75%), Luxembourg (80%), and Denmark (90%). There are often caps on the maximum benefit level, ranging from 33% of a country's average wage (Turkey) to 227% of its average wage (France). The average maximum benefit level is 77% among OECD countries. Most benefit payments are constant over the course of the PBD, though countries such as the Netherlands, Sweden, Hungary, Slovenia, Spain, and Italy have a declining benefit path, in which the wage replacement percentage decreases over time.

Most countries require those receiving unemployment benefits to search for a new job, and can require documentation of job search activities. Benefits may be cut if the applicant does not fulfill the search requirements, or turns down a job offer deemed acceptable by the unemployment benefits agency. Agencies may also provide resources, training, or education for job seekers. Some countries allow beneficiaries to accept part-time jobs without losing benefit eligibility, which can counter the disincentive of unemployment benefits to accepting jobs that do not fully replace the former wages.

Unemployment benefits are typically funded by payroll taxes on employers and employees. This can be supplemented by the government's general tax revenue, which can occur periodically or in response to economic downturn. Contribution rates are usually between 1 and 3% of gross earnings, and are usually split between the employer and employee.

== Economic rationale and issues ==
=== Macroeconomic effects ===
To Keynesians, unemployment insurance acts as an automatic stabilizer. Unemployment benefits can result in redistribution between groups.

=== Private unemployment insurance ===
Adverse selection causes private insurance agencies to set high premiums for the insurance because there is a high likelihood they will have to make payments to the policyholder. High premiums work to exclude many individuals who otherwise might purchase the insurance. "A compulsory government program avoids the adverse selection problem."

=== Moral hazard ===
"At the same time, those workers who managed to obtain insurance might experience more unemployment otherwise would have been the case." The private insurance company would have to determine whether the employee is unemployed through no fault of their own, which is difficult to determine. Incorrect determinations could result in the payout of significant amounts for fraudulent claims or alternately failure to pay legitimate claims. This leads to the rationale that if government could solve either problem that government intervention would increase efficiency. The moral hazard argument against unemployment insurance is based on the idea that such insurance would increase the risk, or 'hazard,' that the insured worker would engage in activity that is undesirable, or 'immoral,' from the insurer's point of view. That is, unemployment insurance could create longer or more frequent episodes of unemployment than would otherwise occur. This could occur if workers partially cushioned against periods of unemployment are more likely to accept jobs that have a higher risk of unemployment, or spend more time searching for a new job after becoming unemployed.

Unemployment Insurance Savings Accounts can protect against unemployment effects with less of the adverse incentives.

=== Unemployment benefits effect on unemployment ===
In the Great Recession, the "moral hazard" issue of whether unemployment insurance—and specifically extending benefits past the maximum 99 weeks—significantly encourages unemployment by discouraging workers from finding and taking jobs was expressed by Republican legislators. Conservative economist Robert Barro found that benefits raised the unemployment rate 2%. Disagreeing with Barro's study were Berkeley economist Jesse Rothstein, who found the "vast majority" of unemployment was due to "demand shocks" not "[unemployment insurance]-induced supply reductions." A study by Rothstein of extensions of unemployment insurance to 99 weeks during the Great Recession to test the hypothesis that unemployment insurance discourages people from seeking jobs found the overall effect of UI on unemployment was to raise it by no more than one-tenth of 1%.

A November 2011 report by the Congressional Budget Office found that even if unemployment benefits convince some unemployed to ignore job openings, these openings were quickly filled by new entrants into the labour market. A survey of studies on unemployment insurance's effect on employment by the Political Economy Research Institute found that unemployed who collected benefits did not find themselves out of work longer than those who did not have unemployment benefits; and that unemployed workers did not search for work more or reduce their wage expectations once their benefits ran out.

One concern over unemployment insurance increasing unemployment is based on experience rating benefit uses which can sometimes be imperfect. That is, the cost to the employer in increased taxes is less than the benefits that would be paid to the employee upon layoff. The firm in this instance believes that it is more cost effective to lay off the employee, causing more unemployment than under perfect experience rating.

An alternative rationale for unemployment insurance is that it may allow for improving the quality of matches between workers and firms. Marimon and Zilibotti argued that although a more generous unemployment benefit system may indeed increase the unemployment rate, it may also help improve the average match quality. A similar point is made by Mazur who analyzed the welfare and inequality effects of a policy reform giving entitlement for unemployment insurance to quitters. Arash Nekoei and Andrea Weber present empirical evidence from Austria that extending unemployment benefit duration raises wages by improving reemployment firm quality. Similarly, Tatsiramos studied data from European countries and found that although unemployment insurance does increase unemployment duration, the duration of subsequent employment tends to be longer (suggesting better match quality).

Unemployment insurance has varying effects on employment and self-employment rates. As self-employment is generally not covered, an increase in UI generosity creates greater disincentives for self-employment, which leads to a positive correlation between UI generosity and the transition from self-employment to paid-employment. Conversely, individuals already in paid-employment experience the opposite trend. This reallocation from self-employment to paid-employment may have a positive effect on the employment rate in the economy but may have a strong negative effect on self-employment rates. It has also been shown that allowing self-employed individuals to access unemployment insurance might lead to a boost in self-employment activity.

=== Job sharing / short-time working ===
Job sharing or work sharing and short time or short-time working refer to situations or systems in which employees agree to or are forced to accept a reduction in working time and pay. These can be based on individual agreements or on government programs in many countries that try to prevent unemployment. In these, employers have the option of reducing work hours to part-time for many employees instead of laying off some of them and retaining only full-time workers. For example, employees in 27 states of the United States can then receive unemployment payments for the hours they are no longer working.

=== Funding ===
Another issue with unemployment benefits relates to its effects on state budgets. During recessionary time periods, the number of unemployed rises and they begin to draw benefits from the program. The longer the recession lasts, depending on the state's starting UI program balance, the quicker the state begins to run out of funds. The recession that began in December 2007 and ended in June 2009 significantly impacted state budgets. According to The Council of State Governments, by 18 March 2011, 32 states plus the Virgin Islands had borrowed nearly $45.7 billion. The Labour Department estimates by the fourth quarter of 2013, as many as 40 states may need to borrow more than $90 billion to fund their unemployment programs and it will take a decade or more to pay off the debt.

Possible policy options for states to shore up the unemployment benefits funds include lowering benefits for recipients and/or raising taxes on businesses. Kentucky took the approach of raising taxes and lowering benefits to attempt to balance its unemployment benefits program. Starting in 2010, a claimant's weekly benefits will decrease from 68% to 62% and the taxable wage base will increase from US$8,000 to US$12,000, over a ten-year period. These moves are estimated to save the state over US$450 million.

== Systems by country ==
Unemployment benefit levels and unemployment rates across the OECD. Countries with higher unemployment benefits do not have higher rates of unemployment.

Across the world, 73 countries offer a form of unemployment benefits. This includes all 37 OECD countries. Among OECD countries for a hypothetical 40-year-old unemployment benefit applicant, the US and Slovakia are the least generous for potential benefit duration lengths, with PBD of six months. More generous OECD countries are Sweden (35 months PBD) and Iceland (36 months PBD); in Australia, Belgium and Ireland the PBD is indefinite.

=== Armenia ===
Armenia's Unemployment Insurance (UI) scheme has been in force since 1991. In 2005, Armenia adopted the law on Employment of the Population and Social Protection in Case of Unemployment, which provided a legal framework to the Unemployment Insurance and active labour policies. Armenia's UI is a contributory program, which is obligatory for public and formal private sectors, as well as the self-employed. To be eligible for benefits, the claimant must be unemployed as a result of business reorganization, staff reduction, or the termination of a collective bargaining agreement. To be eligible, applicants must have contributed for at least 12 months prior to unemployment or be actively looking for work after a long period of unemployment. The UI is also available to first-time job seekers. Those who do not qualify for the monthly payment are nonetheless eligible for the UI scheme's capacity building programs. Those who qualify for the monthly unemployment benefit will get a payment of 18,000 AMD per month for a minimum of 6 months and a maximum of 12 months.

The UI also includes a scheme to help employers hire people who are unemployed with at least 35 years of UI contributions but have not reached retirement age; unemployed for more than three years; returning from corrective or medical institutions; returning from mandatory military service; disabled; refugees; or are 16 years of age and newly eligible to work. Employers who hire these groups are eligible for a benefit of 50% of the minimum wage to supplement the employee's income. The UI also provides financial assistance and capacity-building programs for unemployed or disabled individuals who want to start their own businesses. Armenia also has a Paid Public Works program that provides jobseekers and the disabled with temporary public employment for three months.

=== Australia ===
In Australia, social security benefits, including unemployment benefits, are funded through the taxation system. There is no compulsory national unemployment insurance fund. Rather, benefits are funded in the annual Federal Budget by the National Treasury and are administrated and distributed throughout the nation by the government agency, Centrelink. Benefit rates are indexed to the Consumer Price Index and are adjusted twice a year according to inflation or deflation.

There are two types of payment available to those experiencing unemployment. The first, called Youth Allowance, is paid to young people aged 16–20 (or 15, if deemed to meet the criteria for being considered 'independent' by Centrelink). Youth Allowance is also paid to full-time students aged 16–24, and to full-time Australian Apprenticeship workers aged 16–24. People aged below 18 who have not completed their high school education, are usually required to be in full-time education, undertaking an apprenticeship or doing training to be eligible for Youth Allowance. For single people under 18 years of age living with a parent or parents, the basic rate is A$91.60 per week. For over-18- to 20-year-olds living at home this increases to A$110.15 per week. For those aged 18–20 not living at home the rate is A$167.35 per week. There are special rates for those with partners and/or children.

The second kind of payment is called 'JobSeeker Payment' (called Newstart until 20 June 2020) and is paid to unemployed people over the age of 21 and under the pension eligibility age. To receive a JobSeeker Payment, recipients must be unemployed, be prepared to enter into an Employment Pathway Plan (previously called an Activity Agreement) by which they agree to undertake certain activities to increase their opportunities for employment, be Australian Residents and satisfy the income test (which limits weekly income to A$32 per week before benefits begin to reduce, until one's income reaches A$397.42 per week at which point no unemployment benefits are paid) and the assets test (an eligible recipient can have assets of up to A$161,500 if he or she owns a home before the allowance begins to reduce and $278,500 if he or she does do not own a home). The rate of allowance as of 12 January 2010 for single people without children was A$228 per week, paid fortnightly. (This does not include supplemental payments such as Rent Assistance or Energy Supplement.) Different rates apply to people with partners and/or children.

Effectively, people have had to survive on $39 a day since 1994, and there have been calls to raise this by politicians and NGO groups. On 22 February 2021, the Prime Minister of Australia, Scott Morrison, announced that the JobSeeker base rate would be increased by A$50 a fortnight from April 2021. It is also intended to increase the threshold amount recipients can earn before their payment starts to be reduced.

The system in Australia is designed to support recipients no matter how long they have been unemployed. In recent years the former Coalition government under John Howard has increased the requirements of the Activity Agreement, providing for controversial schemes such as Work for the Dole, which requires that people on benefits for six months or longer work voluntarily for a community organisation regardless of whether such work increases their skills or job prospects. Since the Labor government under Kevin Rudd was elected in 2008, the length of unemployment before one is required to fulfill the requirements of the Activity Agreement (renamed the Employment Pathway Plan) has increased from six to 12 months. There are other options available as alternatives to the Work for the Dole scheme, such as undertaking part-time work or study and training, the basic premise of the Employment Pathway Plan being to keep the welfare recipient active and involved in seeking full-time work.

For people renting their accommodation, unemployment benefits are supplemented by Rent Assistance, which, for single people as at 20 September 2021, begins to be paid when fortnightly rent is more than A$124.60. Rent Assistance is paid as a proportion of total rent paid (75 cents per dollar paid over A$124.60 up to the maximum). The maximum amount of rent assistance payable is A$139.60 per fortnight, and is paid when the total weekly rent exceeds A$310.73 per fortnight. Different rates apply to people with partners and/or children, or who are sharing accommodation.

=== Canada ===
Evolution of the number of EI beneficiaries in Canada by month since 1997

Evolution since 1972 of Employment Insurance (UI before 1996) contribution rate for employees as a % of insurable earnings (in red special rate applicable for Quebec since 2006). The colour bands represents successives governments:
Liberal Party of Canada
Progressive Conservative Party of Canada
Conservative Party of Canada

In Canada, the system is known as "Employment Insurance" (EI, French: Prestations d'assurance-emploi). Formerly called "Unemployment Insurance", the name was changed in 1996. In 2024, Canadian workers paid premiums of 1.66% of insured earnings in return for benefits if they lose their jobs.

The Employment and Social Insurance Act was passed in 1935 during the Great Depression by the government of R. B. Bennett as an attempted Canadian unemployment insurance program. It was, however, ruled unconstitutional by the Supreme Court of Canada as unemployment was judged to be an insurance matter falling under provincial responsibility. After a constitutional amendment was agreed to by all of the provinces, a reference to "Unemployment Insurance" was added to the matters falling under federal authority under the Constitution Act, 1867, and the first Canadian system was adopted in 1940. Because of these problems Canada was the last major Western country to bring in an employment insurance system. It was extended dramatically by Pierre Trudeau in 1971 making it much easier to get. The system was sometimes called the 10/42, because one had to work for 10 weeks to get benefits for the other 42 weeks of the year. It was also in 1971 that the UI program was first opened up to maternity and sickness benefits, for 15 weeks in each case.

The generosity of the Canadian UI program was progressively reduced after the adoption of the 1971 UI Act. At the same time, the federal government gradually reduced its financial contribution, eliminating it entirely by 1990. The EI system was again cut by the Progressive Conservatives in 1990 and 1993, then by the Liberals in 1994 and 1996. Amendments made it harder to qualify by increasing the time needed to be worked, although seasonal claimants (who work long hours over short periods) turned out to gain from the replacement, in 1996, of weeks by hours to qualify. The ratio of beneficiaries to unemployed, after having stood at around 40% for many years, rose somewhat during the 2009 recession but then fell back again to the low 40s. Some unemployed persons are not covered for benefits (e.g. self-employed workers), while others may have exhausted their benefits, did not work long enough to qualify, or quit or were dismissed from their job. The length of time one could take EI has also been cut repeatedly. The 1994 and 1996 changes contributed to a sharp fall in Liberal support in the Atlantic provinces in the 1997 election.

In 2001, the federal government increased parental leave from 10 to 35 weeks, which was added to preexisting maternity benefits of 15 weeks. In 2004, it allowed workers to take EI for compassionate care leave while caring for a dying relative, although the strict conditions imposed make this a little used benefit. In 2006, the Province of Quebec opted out of the federal EI scheme in respect of maternity, parental and adoption benefits, in order to provide more generous benefits for all workers in that province, including self-employed workers. Total EI spending was $19.677 billion for 2011–2012 (figures in Canadian dollars).

Employers contribute 1.4 times the amount of employee premiums. Since 1990, there is no government contribution to this fund. The amount a person receives and how long they can stay on EI varies with their previous salary, how long they were working, and the unemployment rate in their area. The EI system is managed by Service Canada, a service delivery network reporting to the Minister of Employment and Social Development Canada.

A bit over half of EI benefits are paid in Ontario and the Western provinces but EI is especially important in the Atlantic provinces, which have higher rates of unemployment. Many Atlantic workers are also employed in seasonal work such as fishing, forestry or tourism and go on EI over the winter when there is no work. There are special rules for fishermen making it easier for them to collect EI. EI also pays for maternity and parental leave, compassionate care leave, and illness coverage. The program also pays for retraining programs (EI Part II) through labour market agreements with the Canadian provinces.

A significant part of the federal fiscal surplus of the Jean Chrétien and Paul Martin years came from the EI system. Premiums were reduced much less than falling expenditures – producing, from 1994 onwards, EI surpluses of several billion dollars per year, which were added to general government revenue. The cumulative EI surplus stood at $57 billion at 31 March 2008, nearly four times the amount needed to cover the extra costs paid during a recession. This drew criticism from Opposition parties and from business and labour groups, and has remained a recurring issue of the public debate. The Conservative Party, chose not to recognize those EI surpluses after being elected in 2006. Instead, the Conservative government cancelled the EI surpluses entirely in 2010, and required EI contributors to make up the 2009, 2010 and 2011 annual deficits by increasing EI premiums. On 11 December 2008, the Supreme Court of Canada rejected a court challenge launched against the federal government by two Quebec unions, who argued that EI funds had been misappropriated by the government.

=== China ===
The level of benefit is set between the minimum wage and the minimum living allowance by individual provinces, autonomous regions and municipalities.

=== European Union ===
Each Member State of the European Union has its own system and, in general, a worker should claim unemployment benefits in the country where they last worked. For a person working in a country other than their country of residency (a cross-border worker), they will have to claim benefits in their country of residence.

=== Finland ===
Two systems run in parallel, combining a Ghent system and a minimum level of support provided by Kela, an agency of the national government. Unionization rates are high (70%), and union membership comes with membership in an unemployment fund. Additionally, there are non-union unemployment funds. Usually, benefits require 26 weeks of 18 hours per week on average, and the unemployment benefit is 60% of the salary and lasts for 500 days. When this is not available, Kela can pay either regular unemployment benefit or labour market subsidy benefits. The former requires a degree and two years of full-time work. The latter requires participation in training, education, or other employment support, which may be mandated on pain of losing the benefit, but may be paid after the regular benefits have been either maxed out or not available. Although the unemployment funds handle the payments, most of the funding is from taxes and compulsory tax-like unemployment insurance charges.

Regardless of whether benefits are paid by Kela or from an unemployment fund, the unemployed person receives assistance from the Työ- ja elinkeinokeskus (TE-keskus, or the "Work and Livelihood Centre"), a government agency which helps people to find jobs and employers to find workers. In order to be considered unemployed, the seeker must register at the TE-keskus as unemployed. If the jobseeker does not have degree, the agency can require the job seeker to apply to a school.

If the individual does not qualify for any unemployment benefit he may still be eligible for the housing benefit (asumistuki) from Kela and municipal social welfare provisions (toimeentulotuki). They are not unemployment benefits and depend on household income, but they have in practice become the basic income of many long-term unemployed.

=== France ===
France uses a quasi Ghent system, under which unemployment benefits are distributed by an independent agency (UNEDIC) in which unions and Employer organisations are equally represented. UNEDIC is responsible for 3 benefits: ARE, ACA and ASR The main ARE scheme requires a minimum of 122 days membership in the preceding 24 months and certain other requirements before any claims can be made. Employers pay a contribution on top of the pre-tax income of their employees, which together with the employee contribution, fund the scheme.

The maximum unemployment benefit is (as of March 2009) 57.4% of €162 per day (Social security contributions ceiling in 2011), or €6900 per month. Claimants receive 57,4% of their average daily salary of the last 12 months preceding unemployment with the average amount being €1,111 per month. In France, tax and other payroll taxes are paid on unemployment benefits. In 2011, claimants received the allowance for an average 291 days.

=== Germany ===
Germany has a two-tiered system of unemployment benefits. Their common goal is to eventually cease dependence on unemployment benefits entirely. Both programs assist their beneficiaries to varying degrees through

- a living allowance,
- help in finding work or training, and
- if necessary, getting state-funded training.

==== Type I unemployment benefits ====
Type I unemployment benefits (Arbeitslosengeld I) is the first-tier program supporting unemployed people. It is designed like an insurance, involuntary unemployment through no personal fault being the "event of damage". It is therefore also known as unemployment insurance (Arbeitslosenversicherung).

In order to qualify, the unemployed person

- must have made contributions for at least 12 months in the past 30-month period,
- be unemployed, and
- be able to work now or at least in the foreseeable future.

All workers with a regular employment contract (abhängig Beschäftigte), except freelancers and certain civil servants (Beamte), contribute to the system. It is financed by contributions from employees and employers. This is in stark contrast to FUTA in the US and other systems, where only employers make contributions. Participation (and thus contributions) are generally mandatory for both employees and employers.

Employees pay 1.5% of their gross salary below the social security threshold and employers pay 1.5% contribution on top of the salary paid to the employee. The contribution level was reduced from 3.25% for employees and employers as part of labour market reforms known as Hartz. Contributions are paid only on earnings up to the social security ceiling (2012: 5,600 EUR). Furthermore, the system is supported by funds from the federal budget.

In simplified terms, claimants get 60% of their previous net salary (capped at the social security ceiling), or 67% for claimants with children (as long as beneficiary of child benefit). The maximum benefit is therefore €2964 (in 2012). If the benefits fall below the poverty line it is possible to supplement type I unemployment benefits with type II benefits if its conditions are met as well.

Type I unemployment benefits are only granted for a limited period of time, the minimum being 6 months, with a maximum of 24 months in the case of old and long-term insured people. This takes account for the difficulty older people face when re-entering the job market in Germany.

In contrast to type II unemployment benefits, there is no means test. However, it is necessary to remain unemployed while seeking employment. In this context unemployment is defined as working less than 15 hours a week.

==== Type II unemployment benefits ====
Type II unemployment benefits (Arbeitslosengeld II, also colloquially referred to as Hartz IV; 2023 – July 2026 officially Bürgergeld; since July 2026 Grundsicherungsgeld) are an open-ended welfare program intended to ensure people do not fall into poverty.

- In order to be eligible, a person has to permanently reside in Germany, be in possession of a work permit, and be fit for work, i.e. can principally work at least three hours a day. The goal of the program is to terminate one's dependence on it (welfare-to-work). It is not a Universal Basic Income.
- The benefits are subordinated, that means:
  - A person may not eligible for other programmes, especially type I unemployment benefits and pension, but also other legal claims – e.g. dependence on parents, or accounts receivable – can not come to fruition.
  - The person has to be in need (means test): He can not afford a minimum standard living by all incomes in total, or by expending his own previously accumulated assets, e.g. by selling real estate not required or adequate for a bare minimum lifestyle.

Despite its name, unemployment is not a requirement. Due to wage dumping and other labour market dynamics, a large number of working beneficiaries supplement their monthly income. They have the same obligations as non-working beneficiaries.

People receiving benefits are obligated to cease their eligibility at all costs, but at least minimise their dependence on welfare until no money would be paid. That means, they are obliged to seek for jobs nationwide, and accept every job offered, otherwise sanctions (retrenchment) may be applied. There is no recognition of professional qualifications: An academic has to join the menial workforce, regardless of the fact that their potential might be wasted in that industry. Neither are one's personal religious or ethical concerns relevant: Slaughtering animals is allowed, production of weapons for wars is permitted, and prostitution is legal in Germany (although as of 2021 no job centre has urged any beneficiary to engage in prostitution).

In exchange for that, beneficiaries are assisted in that process, e.g. by reimbursing travel expenses to interviews, receiving (free of charge) training in order to increase their chances on the labour market, or subsidising moving expenses once an employment contract has been signed but the place of work requires relocation as it is further than the acceptable daily commute duration (rule of thumb: at most 3 hrs a day). If they do not voluntarily participate in training, they may be obliged by administrative action. Beneficiaries not complying with orders can be sanctioned by pruning their allowance and eventually revoking the grant altogether, virtually pushing them into poverty, homelessness and bankruptcy, as there are no other precautions installed.

Germany does not have an EBT (electronic benefits transfer) card system in place and, instead, disburses welfare in cash or via direct deposit into the recipient's bank account. As of 2026 a single person without children receives at most €563 per month at free disposal intended to cover living expenses, plus costs for reasonable accommodation (rent and heating). People granted benefits are automatically insured at reduced rates in the national health and nursing care insurances. The national pension insurance accounts the time living on benefits, but it does not increase the pension entitlement since in 2011 the federal government stopped paying €205 monthly.

Type II unemployment benefits have been heavily criticized since their introduction. As Type II benefits are meant to ensure a minimum subsistence level, the mechanism of sanctions has repeatedly been a subject in cases before the Federal Constitutional Court. The possibility of sanctions cutting someone's benefits to zero was declared unconstitutional in 2018. In July 2026 it was effectively reintroduced by paying sanctioned recipients €1 per month.

=== Greece ===
Unemployment benefits in Greece are administered through OAED (Greek: Οργανισμός Απασχόλησης Εργατικού Δυναμικού, Manpower Employment Organization) and are available only to laid-off salaried workers with full employment and social security payments during the previous two years. The self-employed do not qualify, and neither do those with other sources of income. The monthly benefit is fixed at the "55% of 25 minimum daily wages", and is currently €360 per month, with a 10% increase for each under-age child. Recipients are eligible for at most 12 months; the exact duration depends on the collected number of ensema ένσημα, that is social security payment coupons-stamps collected (i.e. days of work) during the 14 months before being laid off; the minimum number of such coupons, under which there is no eligibility, is 125, collected in the first 12 of the 14 aforementioned months. Eligibility since 1 January 2013, has been further constrained in that one applying for unemployment benefits for a second or more time, must not have received more than the equivalent of 450 days of such benefits during the last four years since the last time one had started receiving such benefits; if one has received unemployment benefits in this period for more than 450 days then there is no eligibility while if one has received less, then one is only eligible for at most the remaining days up until the maximum of 450 days is reached.

In terms of an unemployment allowance, Greece allows for those found in unemployment, who are employed through an independent profession, to receive benefits if their latest paycheck had not exceeded a certain amount, the current rate should not exceed €1,467.35. When receiving benefits an individual cannot be earning money from a self-employed profession. If the income increases the fixed amount, a tax authority must issue a certificate that explains that the individual has "interrupted the exercise of the profession", which must be done within 15 days. Unemployment benefits are also granted to those who have generated an income that does not exceed €1,467.35 from the final paycheck received from a liberal profession. In order to receive a grant, the individual must not be receiving an income from the previous liberal profession. Seasonal aid is also provided to workers whose jobs cannot be performed through the entire year are also provided benefits by the OAED.

Under the OAED, individuals who are benefiting from long-term unemployment must be within the ages of 20 to 66 years of age and have a family income that does not exceed €10,000 annually. An individual becomes eligible for long-term benefits if the regular unemployment subsidy is exhausted after 12 months. After the expiration of the 12-month period, an application towards long-term unemployment benefits must be submitted in the first 2 months. If an unemployed person seeks long term unemployment and has a child, the allowance is allowed to increase by €586.08 (per child). Long-term unemployment can only be granted if the individual can be found registered under the OAED unemployment registrar.

=== Iceland ===
To receive unemployment benefits in Iceland, one must submit an application to the Directorate of Labour (Vinnumálastofnun) and meet a specific criteria set forth by the department. Icelandic employment rates have traditionally been higher than every other OECD country. In the most recent financial quarter, 85.8% of the Icelandic working-age population were employed, with only 2.8% of the population unemployed. When broken down by age group, Iceland's labour force is highly active, with 74.9% of the population between the ages of 15 and 24 years old and 89.4% of people between the ages of 25 and 55 years old active in the labour market. This low rate of unemployment is attributed to the adoption of the Ghent system, which has been adopted by the countries of Denmark, Finland and Sweden, and highly emphasizes trade and labour unions to provide unemployment benefits and protections to workers, which ultimately has led to higher union membership than other capitalist economies. The safety net that these unions provide also leads to more stable job retention and less reliance on part-time employment. Only 11.9% of the working population is dependent on temporary employment.

Unlike purely social-democratic states in Europe, the Nordic model that Iceland adopted borrows aspects of both a social-democratic and liberal-welfare state. Iceland not only sees high government involvement in providing social welfare and amenities as with the social-democratic model, but like the liberal-welfare model, it is also heavily reliant on free trade and markets. The country relies on an open capitalistic market for economic growth, yet also embraces a corporatist system that allows for wage bargaining to occur between the labour force and employers in order to protect workers and ensure provisions like unemployment benefits are ensured. Currently, the legislation that ensures these benefits is The Act on Trade Unions and Industrial Disputes, which was adopted in 1938 and has been amended five times since its inception to adjust to the rise of globalization. In Section 1, Articles 1–13 grant trade unions the right to organize and negotiate with employers over fair wages for its members as well as representation for their members in the event of workplace conflicts. These rights for organized unions set forth by the Ministry of Welfare not only provide the country's labour force fair and equal representation within their respective industries, but also allow for these organizations to maintain an active relationship with the Icelandic government to discuss economic issues, promote labour and social equality, and ensure benefits for unemployed labourers, as these unions are highly centralized and not politically affiliated.

Unemployment benefits in Iceland (atvinnuleysisbætur) can involve up to 100% reimbursement per month for wage earners for a maximum of 30 months. However, these rates of reimbursement are determined by previous status of employment, such as whether an individual is a wage-earner or is self-employed, as well as meeting certain mandates such as being a current resident of Iceland, be actively searching for employment, and retaining a 25% position for three months within the past 12 months before filing for unemployment. Unemployed workers can be compensated through either basic or income-linked benefits. Basic unemployment benefits can cover both wage-earning and self-employing individuals for the first half-month (10 days) after they lose their job, whereas income-linked benefits can cover wage-earning and self-employing individuals for up to three months based on a set salary index and length of employment. However, those who are unemployed must report to the Directorate of Labour once a month to reaffirm their status of unemployment and that they are actively searching for employment or unemployment benefits could be revoked. Under the Icelandic Labour Law, employees must be given a notice period of termination that can range from 12 days to six months and is determined by the length of previous employment under the same employer.

=== India ===
India follows a social insurance system for unemployment benefits much like its European counterparts. Unemployment allowance is given to workers in India who have contributed to the Employees' State Insurance for at least three years. The benefit is given for a maximum of one year and is either 50% of the average daily wage or Rs 35,000 a month, whichever is lower.

=== Israel ===
In Israel, unemployment benefits are paid by Bituah Leumi (National Insurance Institute), to which workers must pay contributions. Eligible workers must immediately register with the Employment Service Bureau upon losing their jobs or jeopardize their eligibility, and the unemployment period is considered to start upon registration with the Employment Service Bureau. To be eligible for unemployment benefits, a person must be at least 20 years old, have been previously employed, and have completed a "qualifying period" of work for which unemployment insurance contributions were paid which varies between 300 and 360 days. Employees who were involuntarily terminated from their jobs or who terminated their own employment and can provide evidence of having done so for a justified reason are eligible for immediately receiving unemployment benefits, while those who are deemed to have terminated their employment of their own volition with no justified reason will only begin receiving unemployment benefits 90 days from the start of their unemployment period.

Unemployment benefits are paid daily, with the amount calculated based on the employee's previous income over the past six months, but not exceeding the daily average wage for the first 125 days of payment and two-thirds of the daily average wage from the 126th day onwards. During the unemployment period, the Employment Service Bureau assists in helping locate suitable work and job training, and regularly reporting to the Employment Service Bureau is a condition for continuing to receive unemployment benefits. A person who was offered suitable work or training by the Employment Service Bureau but refused will only receive unemployment benefits 90 days after the date of the refusal, and 30 days' worth of unemployment benefits will be deducted for each subsequent refusal.

Members of kibbutzim and moshavim are typically not covered by the national unemployment system and are covered by the community's own social welfare system, unless they are employed outside of their community or directly by the community.

Employees deemed to have been terminated from their jobs without legitimate cause are also legally entitled to severance pay from their employers, equivalent of one month's pay for each year that the unemployed individual had worked for his or her previous employer.

Unions are also involved with the unemployment system in Israel. One such union group is the Histadrut which is commonly known as the General Organization of Workers in Israel. One of the Histadrut's main objectives is to creates job assistance programs to help unemployed workers back into the workforce. Dr. Roby Nathanson, a doctor in economics at the University of Köl, believes these job replacement programs are successful due to the job unemployment rate in Israel. The unemployment rate in Israel in 2009 had been 9.5% and has since dropped to around 4% in 2018.

In addition, there are unemployment benefits for new immigrants who have not yet been able to find employment or who are receiving below minimum wage pay. The time period that they are qualified to receive unemployment benefits is during the first 12 months following their immigration to Israel. They are entitled to support from Havtachat Hachnasa, which is income support that is allocated from National Insurance.

=== Italy ===
Unemployment benefits in Italy consist mainly of cash transfers based on contributions (Assicurazione Sociale per l'Impiego, ASPI), up to the 75% of the previous wages for up to sixteen months. Other measures are:

- Redundancy Fund (Cassa integrazione guadagni, or CIG): cash benefits provided as shock absorbers to those workers who are suspended or who work only for reduced time due to temporary difficulties of their factories, aiming to help the factories in financial difficulties, by relieving them from the costs of unused workforce
- Solidarity Contracts (Contratti di solidarietà): in the same cases granting CIG benefits, companies can sign contracts with reduced work time, to avoid dismissing redundancy workers. The state will grant to those workers the 60% of the lost part of the wage.
- Mobility allowances (Indennità di mobilità): if the Redundancy Fund does not allow the company to re-establish a good financial situation, the workers can be entitled to mobility allowances. Other companies are provided incentives for employing them. This measure has been abolished in 2012 and will stop working in 2017.
- Citizens' income (reddito di cittadinanza): it is a social welfare system created in Italy in January 2019. Although its name recalls one of a universal basic income, this provision is actually a form of conditional and non-individual guaranteed minimum income.

In the Italian unemployment insurance system all the measures are income-related, and they have an average decommodification level. The basis for entitlement is always employment, with more specific conditions for each case, and the provider is quite always the state. An interesting feature worthy to be discussed is that the Italian system takes in consideration also the economic situation of the employers, and aims as well at relieving them from the costs of crisis.

=== Japan ===
Unemployment benefits in Japan are called "unemployment insurance" and are closer to the US or Canadian "user pays" system than the taxpayer funded systems in place in countries such as Britain, New Zealand or Australia. It is paid for by contributions by both the employer and employee.

On leaving a job, employees are supposed to be given a document of unemployment (離職票, rishoku-hyo) showing their ID number (the same number is supposed to be used by later employers), employment periods, and pay (which contributions are linked to). The reason for leaving is also documented separately. These items affect eligibility, timing, and amount of benefits. The length of time that unemployed workers can receive benefits depends on the age of the employee, and how long they have been employed and paying in.

It is supposed to be compulsory for most full-time employees. If they have been enrolled for at least 6 months and are fired or made redundant, leave the company at the end of their contract, or their contract is non-renewed, the now-unemployed worker will receive unemployment insurance. If a worker quit of their own accord they may have to wait between one and three months before receiving any payment.

=== Mexico ===
Mexico lacks a national unemployment insurance system, but it does have five programs to assist the unemployed:

- Mexico City Unemployment Benefit Scheme – The only unemployment insurance system based on worker contributions exists in Mexico City. Unemployed residents of Mexico City who are at least 18 years of age, have worked for at least six months, have no income, and are actively seeking work are eligible for unemployment benefits for up to six months, which are composed of payments of 30 days' worth of minimum wage per month.
- Mexican Social Security Institute (IMSS) – This institution insures workers in the formal sector, providing pensions and health insurance. Workers insured by the IMSS who are unemployed may withdraw a maximum of 30 days' worth of pension savings every five years. However, this does not cover the majority of workers, as 58% of the labour force is in the informal sector.
- National Employment Service – This agency, which has 165 offices nationwide, offers financial support in learning new skills to those aged 16 and above who are unemployed or underemployed, and assistance in finding new jobs in the form of information on vacancies and job fairs.
- Temporary Employment Program – This scheme is designed to aid unemployed people who live in rural areas with high unemployment rates, any area undergoing a financial crisis, or an area that has been hit by a natural disaster or some other kind of emergency. The program funds projects to boost employment by hiring local workers aged 16 and above in jobs such as building infrastructure and promoting development, and conserving the environment and cultural heritage sites. They are paid a salary at 99% of the local minimum wage for a maximum of 132 days a year.
- Income Generating Options Program – People living in poverty in an area of up to a maximum of 15,000 inhabitants are eligible for funding for projects to generate income for themselves.

=== Netherlands ===
Unemployment benefits in the Netherlands were introduced in 1949. Separate schemes exist for mainland Netherlands and for the Caribbean Netherlands.

The scheme in mainland Netherlands entails that, according to the Werkloosheidswet (Unemployment Law, WW), employers are responsible for paying the contributions to the scheme, which are deducted from the salary received by the employees. In 2012 the contribution was 4.55% of gross salary up to a ceiling of €4,172 per month. The first €1,435.75 of an employee's gross salaries are not subject to the 4.55% contribution.

Benefits are paid for a maximum period of 24 months and claimants get 75% of last salary for 2 months and 70% thereafter with a maximum benefit of €3128, depending on how long the claimant has been employed previously. Workers older than 50 years who are unemployed for over 2 months are entitled to a special benefit called the IOAW, if they do not receive the regular unemployment benefit (WW).

=== New Zealand ===
In New Zealand, Jobseeker Support, previously known as the Unemployment Benefit and also known as "the dole" provides income support for people who are looking for work or training for work. It is one of a number of benefits administered by Work and Income, a service of the Ministry of Social Development.

To get this benefit, a person must meet the conditions and obligations specified in section 88A to 123D Social Security Act 1964. These conditions and obligations cover things such as age, residency status, and availability to work.

The amount that is paid depends on things such as the person's age, income, marital status and whether they have children. It is adjusted annually on 1 April and in response to changes in legislature. Some examples of the maximum after tax weekly rate at 1 April 2019 are:

- NZ$200.80 For a single person aged 20–24 years without children
- NZ$210.13 for a single person 25 years or over
- NZ$325.98 for a sole parent
- NZ$350.20 for a married, de facto or civil union couple with or without children (NZ$167.83 each).
- Plus winter payments of extra NZ$20 a week

More information about this benefit and the amounts paid are on the Work and Income website.

External links

- Work and Income website
- Social Security Act 1964

=== Philippines ===
In the Philippines, workers in the private sector who involuntarily became unemployed, including housemaids and Overseas Filipino Workers, are entitled to benefits through the Social Security Act of 2018. Unemployment benefits is sourced from the country's Social Security System (SSS). Under the 2018 legislation, the benefits are dispensed through a one-time payment to equal to 50 percent of the claimant's monthly salary for a maximum of two months. Those who were terminated due to certain reasons such as grave misconduct, gross negligence, and commission of a crime are ineligible to avail unemployment benefits.

For government workers, unemployment benefits are sourced from the Government Service Insurance System (GSIS). Payments are equal to 50 percent of the claimant's average monthly compensation and are dispensed monthly for two to six months, depending on the claimant's length of service.

=== Poland ===
In Poland, the system is designed to prevent people from living off unemployment benefits long term, thus forcing them to work or rely on non-state means of support (family, charities). In order to claim any state unemployment support, an adult (18+) claimant has to prove at least one year of continuous, full employment (that is, minimum 40 hours a week/160 hours a month) in the last 18 months prior to registering with the Unemployment Agency. If approved, as of 2019, one is granted 848 zł (equivalent to US$224.25 in April 2019) before taxes on a month-to-month basis for the first three months, then the amount is automatically lowered to 666 zł (US$176.20 in April 2019) before taxes for the remaining 3–9 months. Therefore, if approved, one can claim unemployment benefits only to the maximum of 12 continuous months. However, during that period, one has to cooperate with the Unemployment Bureau in finding an employment under the strict guidelines of losing the unemployed status, and thus the benefits. In comparison to the unemployment benefits paid by the state, as of January 2019, the minimum monthly pay is 2250,00 zł (US$595.51 in April 2019) before taxes.

=== Russia ===
The least possible Unemployment Allowance is 1500 roubles per month for an unemployed person (appr. US$15,15) and may be paid during 3–6 months. Any person who has not worked during the previous 12 months may be granted such minimal allowance for a 3-months period yearly.

=== Saudi Arabia ===
Saudi Arabia is an economic welfare state with free medical care and unemployment benefits. However, the country relies not on taxation but mainly oil revenues to maintain the social and economic services to its populace.

Payment: 2000 SAR (US$534) for 12 months for an unemployed person aged 18–35.

External links

- Social Services of Saudi Arabia

=== Singapore ===
In the 2024 National Day Rally, Prime Minister Lawrence Wong announced a new unemployment scheme titled "SkillsFuture Jobseeker Support Scheme", and was enacted on April 15 the following year. The scheme announced a support of up to S$6,000 with monthly payments for a period of six months via a declining payment schedule ($1,500 payment in the first month and decreases by $250 each month until the fourth month with a flat $750 payment; lowered based on the salary ceiling cap if applicable), using a point-based system to track activities of completion, ranging from job-seeking related activities thru participating in career counseling.

Under the scheme, residents in Singapore have to be aged no less than 21 years, have an average gross monthly income of no more than S$5,000 over the past 12 months and currently reside in a property with an annual value of no more than S$31,000; they must be involuntarily unemployed (such as medical injury, retrenchment and being fired) from their previous job and have worked in Singapore for at least six out of the past 12 months. The support ends after six months or earlier if the applicant secures their full-time job (or a part-time job with a temporary income of more than $1,500). Applicants could not apply for the scheme again within three years upon their first day of work.

=== Spain ===
In Spain, the unemployment benefits system is part of the social security system. Benefits are managed by the State Public Employment Agency (SEPE). The basis for entitlement is having contributed for a minimum period during the time preceding unemployment, with further conditions that may be applicable. The system comprises contributory benefits and non-contributory benefits.

Contributory benefits are payable to those unemployed persons with a minimum of 12 months' contributions over a period of six years preceding unemployment. The benefit is payable for 1/3 of the contribution period. The benefit amount is 70% of the legal reference salary plus additional amounts for persons with dependants. The benefit reduces to 60% of the reference salary after six months. The minimum benefit is €497 per month and the maximum is €1087.20 per month for a single person. The non-contributory allowance is available to those persons who are no longer entitled to the contributory pension and who do not have income above 75% of the national minimum wage.

=== Sweden ===
Sweden uses the Ghent system, under which a significant proportion of unemployment benefits are distributed by union unemployment funds. Unemployment benefits are divided into a voluntary scheme with income related compensation up to a certain level and a comprehensive scheme that provides a lower level of basic support. The voluntary scheme requires a minimum of 12 months membership and 6 months employment during that time before any claims can be made. Employers pay a fee on top of the pre-tax income of their employees, which together with membership fees, fund the scheme (see Unemployment funds in Sweden).

The maximum unemployment benefit is (as of July 2016) SEK 980 per day. During the first 200 days, the unemployed will receive 80% of his or her normal income during the last 12 months. From day 201–300 this goes down to 70% and from day 301–450 the insurance covers 65% of the normal income (only available for parents to children under the age of 18). In Sweden tax is paid on unemployment benefits, so the unemployed will get a maximum of about SEK 10,000 per month during the first 100 days (depending on the municipality tax rate). In other currencies, as of June 2017, this means a maximum of approximately £900, US$1,150, or €1,000, each month after tax. Private insurance is also available, mainly through professional organisations, to provide income-related compensation that otherwise exceeds the ceiling of the scheme. The comprehensive scheme is funded by tax.

=== Turkey ===
By law, legally employed workers, regardless of their citizenship are eligible for unemployment benefits given that they are at least 18 years old, the employees contribute 1% to unemployment funds while the employers contribute 2%, and the workers are eligible to receive benefits after 600 days of contributions within the preceding 3 years of employment. the benefit payment is 50% for the average daily earnings based on the last 4 months and cannot be higher than the minimum wage (per industry). Benefits may be paid for a max of 1,080 days depending on the number of contributions. Some are skeptical of how well the system is functioning in Turkey

=== United Kingdom ===
Unemployment benefit is paid in the United Kingdom either as Jobseeker's Allowance or (for most people) as an element of Universal Credit.

==== Jobseeker's Allowance rates ====
Jobseeker's Allowance (JSA) is changed annually; for the 2020/2021 tax year (commencing 6 April 2020) the maximum payable is £74.35 per week for a single person aged over 25 or £58.90 per week for a single person aged 18–24. The rules for couples where both are unemployed are more complex, but a maximum of £116.80 per week is payable, dependent on age and other factors. For those who are still getting Income-based JSA or are getting Universal Credit, and having savings of over £6,000, there is a reduction of £1 per week per £250 of savings up to £16,000. People with savings of over £16,000 are not able to get Income-based JSA or Universal Credit at all. The system previously provided rent payments as part of a separate scheme called Housing Benefit, but for most new claimants this benefit is now instead paid as an element of the comprehensive Universal Credit scheme.

=== United States ===
Unemployment rate by county from January 1990 – March 2017

In the United States, there are 50 state unemployment insurance programs plus one each in the District of Columbia, Puerto Rico and United States Virgin Islands. Though policies vary by state, unemployment benefits generally pay eligible workers as high as US$1,015 in Massachusetts to a low as US$235 per week maximum in Mississippi. Eligibility requirements for unemployment insurance vary by state, but generally speaking, employees not fired for misconduct ("terminated for cause") are eligible for unemployment benefits, while those who quit or who are fired for misconduct (this sometimes can include misconduct committed outside the workplace, such as a problematic social media post or committing a crime) are not. Receipt varies substantially by state; nationally, roughly one in four unemployed people received unemployment insurance in 2025.

== See also ==
- Compensation of employees
- Funemployment
- HIRE Act
- Involuntary unemployment
- Labour power
- Lorenz curve
- Participation income
- Reserve army of labour
- Social insurance
- Social rights
- Smart contract
- Unemployment extension
- Workfare
