= Gösta Rehn =

Swedish economist

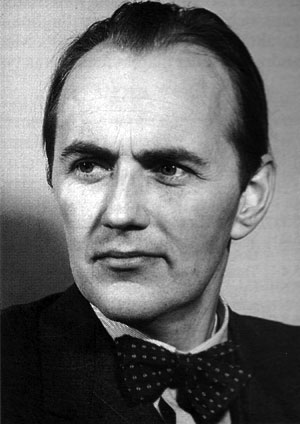
Lars Gösta Rehn in 1955

Lars Gösta Rehn (1913 – 1 December 1996) was a Swedish economist.

== Life ==
Rehn studied at the Stockholm University and its Social Research Institute (Socialinstitutet). He started to work as an economist for the Swedish Trade Union Confederation in 1930, being this his full-time employment since 1943. In 1952-58 he worked with labour market policy questions for two committees at government level. In 1959-62, Rehn was employed by the Ministry of Finance as responsible for the Government's economic forecasts and analyzes of the effects of fiscal policy. In 1962 he became head of the Department of Labour and Social Affairs at the OECD in Paris. In 1973-79 he was director of the Institute for Social Research at Stockholm University, where he lectured and also researched after his retirement. He was also a guest researcher at the University of California at Berkeley in 1979-80.

Together with Rudolf Meidner, he developed the Rehn–Meidner model, a staple of the economic and social Swedish model.

== Bibliography ==
- Los Sindicatos y la Crisis Económica - G. Bretaña, Alemana Y Suecia - P. Gourevitch, A. Martin, S. Bornstein e A. Markovits 1991 Ministerio de Trabajo y seguridad social. ISBN 84-7434-655-X
- Full sysselsättning utan inflation. Skrifter i urval. - Gösta Rehn, Eskil Wadensjö, Åke Dahlberg, Bertil Holmlund Tidens Förlag, 1988 (Full employment without inflation)
