= Rudolf Meidner =

Swedish economist (1914–2005)

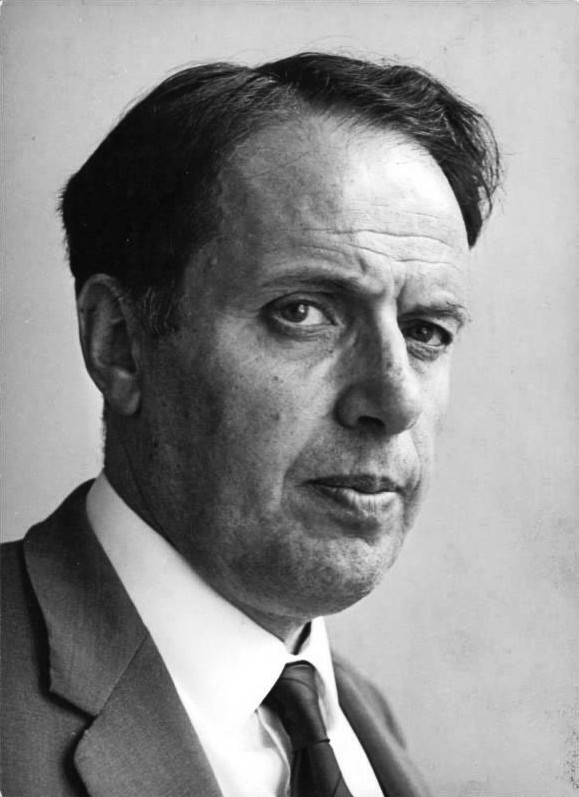
- Meidner in 1966
- Born: Rudolf Alfred Meidner; 23 June 1914; Breslau, Kingdom of Prussia, German Empire (present-day Wrocław, Poland)
- Died: 9 December 2005 (aged 91); Lidingö, Sweden
- Political party: Swedish Social Democratic Party
- Spouse: Ella Jörgenssen (m. 1937)
- Awards: Illis quorum 1997

Scholarly background
- Education: Stockholm University
- Thesis: Swedish Labour Market at Full Employment (1954)
- Doctoral advisor: Gunnar Myrdal
- Influences: John Maynard Keynes; Karl Marx; Hans Singer

Scholarly work
- Discipline: Economics
- Institutions: Swedish Trade Union Confederation; Stockholm University
- Notable ideas: Meidner plan; Rehn–Meidner model

Rudolf Alfred Meidner (23 June 1914 – 9 December 2005) was a Swedish economist and socialist.

== Biography ==
Meidner was born on 23 June 1914 in Breslau, Silesia. Meidner became interested in Marxism as a teenager. He attended several Communist Party meetings, but did not end up joining the party. He moved to Berlin in 1932 to further his education. Following the appointment of Nazi Edmund Heines as police chief in Breslau in 1933, he fled to Sweden. In Sweden, he studied economics and statistics at Stockholm University.

In 1937, Meidner married Ella Jörgenssen and he became a Swedish citizen in 1943.

Meidner was an economist and the developer of the employee funds plan proposed by the Swedish Trade Union Confederation in the 1970s. He studied under the economist and Nobel Prize laureate Gunnar Myrdal. He got his Doctor of Philosophy degree in 1954 with a dissertation labeled Swedish Labour Market at Full Employment. He spent most of his work life at the Swedish Trade Union Confederation as a researcher.

Meidner was awarded the Illis quorum by the Swedish government in 1997.

Meidner died on 9 December 2005 in Lidingö, aged 91.

== Rehn–Meidner model ==
Meidner and the Swedish economist Gösta Rehn were responsible for the Rehn–Meidner model for economic growth as promulgated by the Swedish Social Democratic Party and the LO, the blue-collar trade union. The Rehn–Meidner model was first proposed in 1951 and for over the next twenty-five years was the basis for the low-inequality, high-tech oriented, rapid-innovation Swedish economy which also was exposed to international trade and became export oriented. In response to the increasing demand on the part of workers, communities and women for a share of the excess profits (permitted by a capital-labor-state wage suppression agreement) accumulated in an increasingly powerful capitalist sector, Meidner created a proposal in 1976, published by the LO, that called for requiring all companies above a certain size to issue new stock shares to workers so that within twenty years the workers would control 52 per cent of the companies they worked in. This policy followed in Meidner's career-long efforts to build a step-wise, peaceful, institutionally supported transition to a socialist society, whose carefully crafted incentive structure and culture would allow each member of society to work and contribute according to her or his capacity and receive social support according to her or his needs.

Supported by important Swedish policy designer Walter Korpi, Meidner's work was opposed by pro-capitalist Social Democrats, including the Finance Minister Kjell-Olof Feldt as well as Gösta Rehn (proponent of active labour market policies) and Olof Palme. The increasing ambitions and occasional militancy of the Swedish working class in conjunction with Meidner's progressive socialist institutional planning politicized the Swedish capitalist class via the Swedish Employers Association (SAF), who joined other countries' capitalist classes to oppose working class organizational bases and to promote capital deregulation and mobility. The SAF's response was to model their political and policy strategies after the New Zealand capitalist class' campaign which had successfully destroyed a labor movement of similar strength to the Swedish labor movement.

The Rehn–Meidner model resulted in Sweden having a very egalitarian wage system so that wage differentials between professions was very low, fortifying a low Gini coefficient. However, in the absence of the socialist steps urged by Meidner in the 1970s the economic model resulted in capital concentration (despite a very active social policy, Sweden has one of the highest percentages of private ownership of capital in the world) to the point where in the late 1970s 25 per cent of share capital was held by the top 0.1 per cent of shareholders and 75 per cent by the top 10 per cent.
