= Nordic model =

Social and economic model in Nordic countries

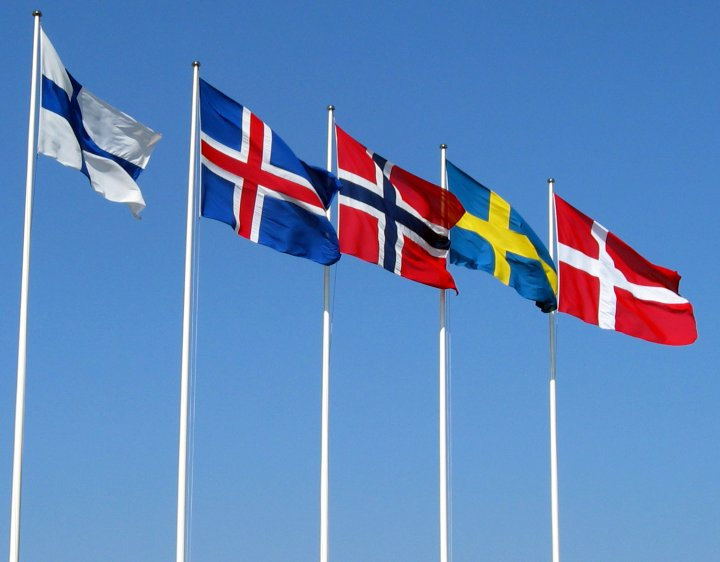
Flags of the Nordic countries, from left to right: Finland, Iceland, Norway, Sweden, and Denmark

The Nordic model comprises the economic and social policies, as well as typical cultural practices, common in the Nordic countries (Denmark, Finland, Iceland, Norway, and Sweden). Historically, this included a comprehensive welfare state and multi-level collective bargaining based on social corporatism, and a commitment to private ownership within a market-based mixed economy. Norway is a partial exception due to a large number of state-owned enterprises, state ownership in publicly listed firms, and its sovereign wealth fund.

Although the Nordic countries retain significant differences, they share some common traits. The three Scandinavian countries are constitutional monarchies, while Finland and Iceland became republics in the 20th century. All the Nordic countries are described as democratic.

All have a unicameral legislature and use proportional representation. They all support a free market and universalist welfare state aimed specifically at enhancing individual autonomy and promoting social mobility, employing a sizable percentage of the population (roughly 30% of the work force in areas such as healthcare, education, and government), and a corporatist system with a highly unionized workforce. Representatives of labour and employers negotiate wages and labour market policy mediated by the government. As of 2020, all of the Nordic countries ranked highly on the inequality-adjusted HDI and the Global Peace Index, as well as ranking in the top 10 in the World Happiness Report.

The Nordic model was developed in the 1930s under the leadership of social democrats. Centrist and right-wing political parties, as well as labour unions contributed to its development. The Nordic model gained attention after World War II. It has continued to evolve, including decreased regulation and expanded privatization. However, it is distinguished from other models by its emphasis on public services and social investment.

== Characteristics ==
The 2007 Nordic model was characterized as follows:

- An elaborate social safety net, including free education and universal healthcare, largely tax-funded
- Protection of property rights, contract enforcement and working to make doing business straightforward
- Public pension plans
- Democracy
- Free trade
- Labour market protections supporting trade unions. In 2019, trade union participation was 90.7% in Iceland, 67.0% in Denmark, 65.2% in Sweden, 58.8% in Finland, and 50.4% in Norway, versus 16.3% in Germany and 9.9% in the US.
- Free markets: high OECD product market freedom rank
- Attacks on corruption
- Employers, trade unions and the government mutually negotiate workplace regulation. Sweden decentralised wage co-ordination, while Finland is the least flexible in the group. Changing economic conditions have pressured unions to resist reforms.
- Reliance on public service provision
- High taxes (% of GDP): Iceland (35.9%), Norway (41.4%), Sweden (41.4%), Finland (42.4%), Denmark (43.4%) versus OECD average of 33.9%. Income taxes are relatively progressive; combined with their welfare systems.

=== Outcomes ===
Nordics scored high in the Freedom in the World survey and Democracy Index. United Nations World Happiness Reports state that Northern Europe has the happiest populations. Nordics ranked highest on metrics of real GDP per capita, healthy life expectancy, having someone to count on, perceived freedom to make life choices, generosity and freedom from corruption. The Nordic countries placed in the top 10 of the World Happiness Report 2018, with Finland and Norway taking the top spots. The International Trade Union Confederation's 2014 Global Rights Index ranked Nordic countries the highest for workers' rights; Denmark was the only nation to receive a perfect score. Transparency International's 2022 Corruption Perceptions Index, ranked Denmark, Finland, Norway and Sweden among the 10 least corrupt of the 180 countries evaluated. Norway spends 48.3% of GDP, Sweden 49.4%, Iceland 49.8%, Denmark 50.8% and Finland 55.8%, all higher than the 46.3% OECD average. Post-transfer income inequality is among the world's lowest.

=== Economic system ===
The Nordic model combines capitalism with a large public sector that employs roughly 30% of the workforce, providing services in areas such as healthcare and higher education. In the early 21st century, in Norway, Finland, and Sweden, many companies and industries were state-run or state-owned, including utilities, mail, rail transport, airlines, electrical power industry, fossil fuels, the chemical industry, steel mills, electronics, machine, aerospace manufacturing, shipbuilding, and the arms industry.

In 2013, The Economist described these countries as "stout free-traders who resist the temptation to intervene even to protect iconic companies", while also looking for ways to temper capitalism's harsher effects. It declared that the Nordic countries "are probably the best-governed in the world". Some economists have referred to the Nordic economic model as "cuddly capitalism", with low levels of inequality, generous welfare states, and fewer top incomes, contrasting it with the US' more "cut-throat capitalism", which has high levels of inequality.

In the early 21st century, the Nordic model was a market economic system that featured private ownership, with the exception of Norway, which included many state-owned enterprises and state ownership in public firms.

As a result of the Swedish financial crisis of 1990–1994, Sweden deregulated its economy and strengthened competition laws. Despite this, Sweden still has the highest government spending-to-GDP ratio among the Nordics. It retains national-level sectoral bargaining unlike Denmark and Iceland, with over 650 national-level bargaining agreements. It retains the Ghent system, unlike Norway and Iceland and consequently has the world's second-highest unionization rate. As one of the most equal OECD nations, from 1985 to the 2010s Sweden saw the largest growth in income inequality among OECD economies. Other effects of the 1990s reforms were the growth of mutual fund savings, which largely began with the Allemansfonder program in the 1980s in which the government subsidized savings; As of 2019 4 out of 5 Swedes aged 18–74 have fund savings.

==== Norway ====
Norway has ownership stakes in many of the country's largest listed companies, including 37% of the Oslo stock market. It operates some of the country's largest non-listed companies, including Equinor and Statkraft. In January 2013, The Economist reported, "after the Second World War the government nationalised all German business interests in Norway and ended up owning 44% of Norsk Hydro's shares. The formula of controlling business through shares rather than regulation seemed to work well, so the government used it wherever possible. 'We invented the Chinese way of doing things before the Chinese', says Torger Reve of the Norwegian Business School."

The government operates a sovereign wealth fund, the Government Pension Fund of Norway, largely funded by oil revenues, whose partial objective is to prepare Norway for a post-oil future. However, "unusually among oil-producing nations, it is also a big advocate of human rights – and a powerful one, thanks to its control of the Nobel Peace Prize."

Managing substantial petroleum wealth alongside high public expenditures presents ongoing fiscal tradeoffs for Norway. Investing energy revenue overseas provides protection for domestic industries from oil price swings and build capital towards future investments. However, large transfers from the sovereign wealth fund to cover non-oil budget losses can create increased pressure on domestic demand and can lead to increased inflation. At the same time, Norway faces increased risk to its large welfare system and current public spending due to an ageing population and high rates of long-term sickness and disability that both negatively effects the labor supply and the longevity of their current financial system. There is a growing emphasis on budget discipline from economists and being able to maintain steady inflation is crucial to long term success. Going forward, focusing on stronger workforce participation, better school skills, and business growth outside the oil sector will lead to a strong and more stable Norwegian economy going forward.

Norway is the only major economy in Northern Europe where younger generations are getting richer, with a 13% increase in disposable income for 2018, bucking the trend seen in other Northern European nations of millennials becoming poorer than the generations which came before.

=== Social democracy ===
Vote percentage over time of the main social democratic parties in Denmark, Finland, Sweden, and Norway: Swedish Social Democratic Party Labour Party (Norway) Social Democrats (Denmark) Social Democratic Party of Finland

Social democracy is a centre-left, social, economic, predominantly capitalist political ideology. Social democrat parties long governed in Sweden and Norway, while in the others social democrat parties and others at times formed coalition governments. Policies enacted by social democrats helped foster social cohesion.

While many countries have at times adopted social democracy, only the Nordic countries did so consistently.

Since the 1990s politicians, researchers and the media have increasingly explained the Nordic model in cultural rather than political terms. Earlier interpretations of the welfare state were attributed to political developments. However, in later years political factors increased in importance.

=== Lutheran influence ===
Lutheranism is the religious tradition of the Nordic countries. It promoted the idea of a nationwide community of believers and led to increased state involvement in economic and social life.

Lutheran revival movements increased support for the modern welfare state, leading important social responsibilities (health care, education, and social work) to be absorbed by the state. This was made easier by the church's centralized structure, which made the transition less disruptive.

=== Labour markets ===
The Nordic countries have similar labour market policies intended to reduce conflict between labour and business. This system is most extensive in Norway and Sweden, where employer federations and labour representatives bargain at the national level, mediated by the government. Labour market interventions emphasize job retraining and relocation.

The Nordic labour market is flexible, with laws making it easy for employers to hire and shed workers or introduce technology. Labour market policies rely on generous social welfare, job retraining and relocation services to mitigate potential conflicts.

In Sweden trade unions and employer organisations negotiate working conditions and pay without government involvement. Workers agree not to strike while employers agree not to lock them out. While some laws regulate basic labour rights, Sweden has no statutory minimum wage. Instead, pay is regulated through agreements. Should workers strike, the employer can claim refusal to work.Under a collective agreement, neither the trade union nor the employer is allowed to take any labour action such as strikes or lockouts until the agreement expires. The two largest trade unions are Landsorganisationen (LO) and SACO. Both are umbrella organisations comprising 34 trade unions, representing occupations such as bus and train drivers, constructions workers, teachers, industrial workers, and engineers. The main employer organisations are Sveriges Kommuner och Regioner (SKR) and Svenskt Näringsliv, which represent companies in the public sector and the private and business sectors, respectively.

=== Welfare model ===
The Nordic model is distinguished from others by its emphasis on maximising labour force participation, promoting gender equality, egalitarianism, extensive benefits, income redistribution, and liberal use of expansionary fiscal policy.

The Nordic countries all share a broad commitment to social cohesion, universal welfare provision, and maximising public participation in social decision-making. It is characterized by flexibility and innovation. Nordic welfare systems are mainly funded through government spending.

Nordic countries take different approaches to the administration of the welfare state. Denmark adopted private sector provision of public services and welfare, alongside an assimilation immigration policy. Iceland's welfare model is based on a "welfare-to-work" (workfare) model, while Finland relies on non-profits to play a significant role in elder care. Norway relies most extensively on public provision of welfare.

==== Gender equality ====
Nordic countries maintain one of the smallest gaps in gender employment inequality of all OECD countries, according to International Labour Organization standards. They implemented many policies to promote gender equality; they were some of the first to forbid companies from dismissing women on grounds of marriage or motherhood. Mothers in Nordic countries are more likely to work than in any other region. Families enjoy supportive parental leave policies that compensate mothers and fathers for moving from work to home to care for their children. Work place policies vary from country to country, but Nordic countries support "continuous full-time employment" for both men and women, including single parents. Aside from support for parental leave, families benefit from subsidized early childhood education and care and activities for out-of-school hours for schoolchildren.

Nordic countries champion gender equality and corresponding women's employment. Between 1965 and 1990, Sweden's employment rate for working-age women (15–64) went from 52.8% to 81.0%. In 2016, nearly three out of every four women of working-age were in paid work. Women are the main users of parental leave (fathers use less than 30% of their allotment), while foreign women are under-represented.

==== Poverty reduction ====
The Nordic model has significantly reduced poverty. In 2011, poverty rates before tax and transfers ranged from Finland (31.9%) to Iceland (21.6%), with Denmark ( 24.7%), Norway (25.6%), and Sweden (26.5%) in between. After tax and transfers, the poverty rates for the same year shrank to 7.5%, 5.7%, 6%, 7.7%, and 9.7% respectively, averaging a reduction of 18.7 p.p. Compared to the United States, which has a pre-tax/transfer poverty level of 28.3% and post-tax/transer of 17.4% for a reduction of 10.9%, the effects of tax and transfers on poverty in all the Nordic countries are substantially bigger. In comparison to France (27 percentage point reduction) and Germany (24.2% p.p reduction), taxes and transfers in the Nordic countries are smaller.

== History ==
During the Viking Age and High Middle Ages, especially in Sweden, royal power was initially weak. In areas outside the rule of the Swedish king, as well as in Iceland where the Icelandic Commonwealth was an unusually large and sophisticated peasant republic building on the same democratic traditions. Some historians argued that Gotland was a peasant republic before it was attacked by the Danes in 1361. Central for the original Scandinavian democratic traditions was assemblies called the Thing or Moot.

The Nordic model began with a "grand compromise" between workers and employers spearheaded by farmer and worker parties in the 1930s. Following a period of economic crisis and class struggle, the grand compromise served as the foundation for the post-World War II Nordic model of welfare and labour market organization. Contrarily, a 2022 study reported that farmer Members of Parliaments consistently opposed generous welfare policies.

Another key element was a varying mixture of mainly social democratic, centrist, and right-wing political parties. Social democratic parties played a larger role in Sweden and Norway, whereas in Iceland and Finland, right-wing political parties were more significant. Strong labour unions were important in all four countries.

Social security and collective wage bargaining policies were rolled back following economic imbalances in the 1980s and financial crises in the 1990s which led to leaner budgetary policies, most pronounced in Sweden and Iceland. Nonetheless, welfare expenditure remained high compared to the European average.

=== Denmark ===
Social welfare reforms emerged from the Kanslergade Agreement of 1933 as part of a compromise package to save the Danish economy.

=== Finland ===
The early 1990s recession caused a deep crisis in Finland, and came amid the context of the collapse of the Soviet Union and trade with the Eastern Bloc. Worse than Sweden, Finland's welfare state was weakened and no longer took the social-democratic middle ground, as several social welfare policies were dismantled.

=== Iceland ===
Iceland in the late 2010s moved away from the Nordic model towards the liberal economic model of workfare. At the time, critics claimed that "70% of elderly people now live well below national subsistence criteria, while about 70% of those who live alone and in bad conditions are women." However, as of 2021, Iceland had the OECD's lowest poverty rate, 4.9%.

=== Norway ===
For a period in the 1980s and the 1990s, Norway underwent more neoliberal reforms and marketization than Sweden, while still holding to the traditional foundations of the Nordic model.

Norway earned billions from its portion of North Sea oil, which it used to fund the country's sovereign wealth fund. As of 2007, the Norwegian state maintained ownership positions in key industrial sectors, including petroleum, natural gas, minerals, lumber, seafood and fresh water. The petroleum industry accounts for around a quarter of the country's gross domestic product.

=== Sweden ===
In Sweden, the Nordic model started with the Saltsjöbaden Agreement signed by employer and trade union associations in 1938. It was advanced by the Swedish Social Democratic Party, which led the nation from 1932 until 1976. Initially differing little from other capitalist countries, the state's role in providing welfare and infrastructure expanded after WWII, reaching a broadly social democratic consensus in the 1950s which became known as social liberalism, followed by the neoliberal paradigm by the 1980s and 1990s.

In the 1950s, Olof Palme and prime minister Tage Erlander formulated the basis of Swedish social democracy, the "Swedish model". The party wanted to help workers, and adopted the Fabian argument that the country could move to socialism. This would come about through welfare funded by capitalism. It supported a strong labour movement as well as publicly funded and often publicly administered welfare institutions.

By the early 1980s, the Swedish model began to suffer from trade imbalances, declining competitiveness, and capital flight. Two solutions emerged. The country could transition to socialism, socializing (taking ownership of) industry or commit capitalism and markets by embracing neoliberalism. The Swedish model was first challenged in 1976 by the Meidner Plan promoted by the Swedish Trade Union Confederation that aimed at the socialization of Swedish companies through wage earner funds. The Meidner Plan aimed to collectivize capital formation over two generations by having wage earner funds buy dominant stakes in Swedish corporations. A different type of wage earner fund was implemented following the success of the Social Democrats in the 1982 election. They were disbanded after the 1991 election when conservatives came to power.

Upon returning to power in 1982, the Social Democratic party inherited a slowing economy following the post-war boom. The Social Democrats adopted monetarist and neoliberal policies, deregulated the banking industry, and liberalized currency in the 1980s. The 1990s economic crisis brought greater austerity measures, deregulation, and privatization of public services. In the 21st century, it affected Sweden's welfare state. Sweden remained more Eurosceptic than Finland, and its struggles affected other Nordics, as "the guiding star of the north". Other Nordic countries felt they were losing their political identities. The Nordic model was gradually rediscovered, and cultural explanations were sought for the Nordic model.

== Reception ==
=== Proponents ===
The Nordic model was positively received by some American politicians and political commentators. Jerry Mander likened the Nordic model to a kind of "hybrid" system that blends capitalist economics with socialist values, an alternative to American-style capitalism. Vermont Senator Bernie Sanders claimed that the US could learn from the Nordic model, particularly worker benefits and social protections and its universal healthcare. Scandinavian political scientist Daniel Schatz argued that Sanders is wrong, saying that "the success of Nordic countries....has its roots in cultural rather than economic factors", particularly its "high levels of social trust, robust work ethic, and social cohesion".

According to Luciano Pellicani, Nordic social and political measures are the same that some other European left-wing politicians theorised to combine justice and freedom, referring to liberal socialism and movements like Giustizia e Libertà and Fabian Society. According to Naomi Klein, former Soviet leader Mikhail Gorbachev sought to move the Soviet Union in a similar direction to the Nordic system, combining free markets with a social safety net, but still retaining public ownership of key sectors of the economy – ingredients that he believed would transform the Soviet Union into "a socialist beacon for all mankind."

The Nordic model was positively received by left-wing social scientists and economists. American professor of sociology and political science Lane Kenworthy advocated for the US to follow the Nordic model.

American author Ann Jones, who lived in Norway for four years, posits that "the Nordic countries give their populations freedom from the market by using capitalism as a tool to benefit everyone" whereas in the United States "neoliberal politics puts the foxes in charge of the henhouse, and capitalists have used the wealth generated by their enterprises (as well as financial and political manipulations) to capture the state and pluck the chickens."

Nobel Prize-winning economist Joseph Stiglitz stated that social mobility is higher in Scandinavian countries than in the United States and that Scandinavia had become the land of opportunity that the United States once was.

Economist Jeffrey Sachs is a proponent, saying that the Nordic model is "the proof that modern capitalism can be combined with decency, fairness, trust, honesty, and environmental sustainability". A 2016 survey by Israel Democracy Institute reported that nearly 60 percent of Israeli Jews preferred a "Scandinavian model" economy, with high taxes and a robust welfare state.

=== Criticism ===
Socialist economists Pranab Bardhan and John Roemer stated that Nordic-style social democracy required a strong labour movement to sustain it and was not applicable to countries with weaker labour movements. They further questioned its sustainability given its decline in Scandinavia since the 1990s. They advocated that market-based government ownership would beat social democratic redistribution for promoting egalitarian outcomes.

In a 2017 study, economists James Heckman and Rasmus Landersøn compared American and Danish social mobility, and found that Denmark ranked higher in income mobility, although Danish social mobility was lower than typically reported. Before taxes and transfers, Danish and American social mobility were similar, although after taxes and transfers Danish social mobility relatively improved, indicating that Danish economic redistribution was beneficial. However, Denmark's investment in public education did not improve the likelihood that children of non-college educated parents would attend college, although cognitive skills improved among poor Danish children compared to their American peers. Instead, generous welfare policies appeared to discourage higher-level education due to the reduced relative economic benefits from college education.

Some welfare and gender researchers suggest that social issues associated with bodily integrity or bodily citizenship, such as some forms of male domination continue in the Nordic countries, in areas of business, violence to women, sexual violence to children, the military, academia, and religion.

While praising the Nordic model as a "clear and compelling contrast to the neoliberal ideology that has strafed the rest of the world with inequality, ill-health and needless poverty," economic anthropologist Jason Hickel sharply criticizes the "ecological disaster" that accompanies it, noting that data shows the Nordic countries "have some of the highest levels of resource use and CO2 emissions in the world, in consumption based terms, drastically overshooting safe planetary boundaries," and rank towards the bottom of the Sustainable Development Index. He argues that the model needs to be updated for the Anthropocene, and reduce overconsumption while retaining the positive elements of progressive social democracy including universal healthcare and education, paid vacations and reasonable working hours, which have resulted in much better health outcomes and poverty reduction compared to overtly neoliberal countries like the United States, in order to "stand as a beacon for the rest of the world in the 21st century."

Swedish economist John Gustavsson criticized the Nordic model for its high taxation rates, including on the middle and lower classes.

=== Misconceptions ===
George Lakey claimed that Americans misunderstand the Nordic model: "Americans imagine that 'welfare state' means the U.S. welfare system on steroids....Nordics provide...universal services, which means everyone – rich and poor – gets free higher education, free medical services, free eldercare, etc".

Lars Løkke Rasmussen, the Danish prime minister from the conservative-liberal Venstre party, stated: "I know that some people in the US associate the Nordic model with some sort of socialism. Therefore, I would like to make one thing clear. Denmark is far from a socialist planned economy. Denmark is a market economy."

== See also ==
- Dirigisme, a socioeconomic model associated with France
- Economic progressivism
- Folkhemmet
- Liberal socialism
- Market socialism
- Nefco
- Polder model
- Rehn–Meidner model
- Rhenish model, a socioeconomic model associated with Germany
- Social democracy
- Social market economy
- Welfare in Finland
- Welfare in Sweden

=== Lists ===
- Human Development Index
- Legatum Prosperity Index
- List of countries by GDP per capita
- List of countries by income equality
- List of countries by life expectancy
- List of countries by share of income of the richest one percent
- List of countries by wealth per adult
- List of international rankings
- Press Freedom Index
- Social Progress Index
- Where-to-be-born Index
