= German model =

Post-World War II West German economic model

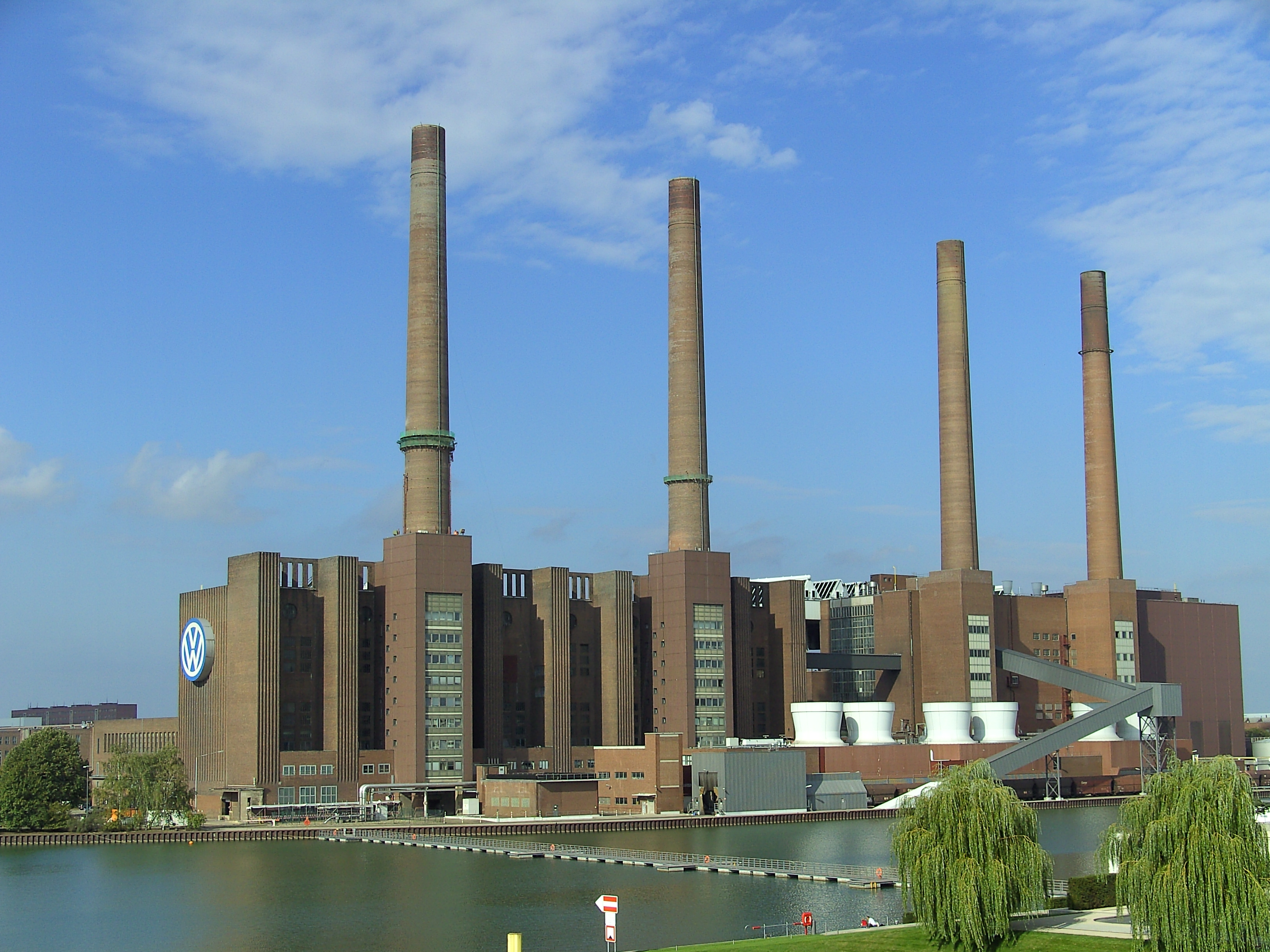
The Volkswagen factory in Wolfsburg

The term German model is most often used in economics to describe post-World War II West Germany's means of using (according to University College London Professor Wendy Carlin) innovative industrial relations, vocational training, and closer relationships between the financial and industrial sectors to cultivate economic prosperity. The two key components of the German model is a national system for certifying industrial and artisan skills, as well as full union participation in the oversight of plant-based vocation training.

The German model of collective bargaining differs from the model common in other European countries and the United States. In Germany, unions and employer associations bargain at the industry-region level. In contrast to tripartite corporatist systems, the German government is not involved in the negotiations. These large-scale agreements have broad coverage and lead to considerable standardization in wages and employment conditions across the country. Some bargaining occurs at the firm level.

== History ==
In 1869, legislation liberalized apprenticeship training, removing restrictions on who could take on apprentices. In 1881, 1884, and 1887, legislation tightened the restrictions. A law passed in 1897, the Handicraft Protection Law, stabilized a plant-based apprenticeship system in German industry. The law set limits on the number of apprentices a firm could take on and introduced a monitoring system for the quality of training. According to Kathleen Thelen, this law played an essential role in cementing what would become the German model. The 1897 law was the result of bargaining between the state and the artisanal sector, which had a supportive relationship. Organized labor had a minimal impact on the legislation and the social democrats opposed the legislation due to suspicion of the traditional artisanal sector. Thelen writes that the impetus for the legislation was "deeply political and mostly illiberal." Over time, the social democrats were incentivized not to dismantle the system established by the law, as labor unions became increasingly filled with skilled workers trained under the apprenticeship system. In the Weimar Republic, German unions had become advocates of the in-plant training system. Gradual changes were made to the vocational training system in the 20th century.

== Industrial relations ==
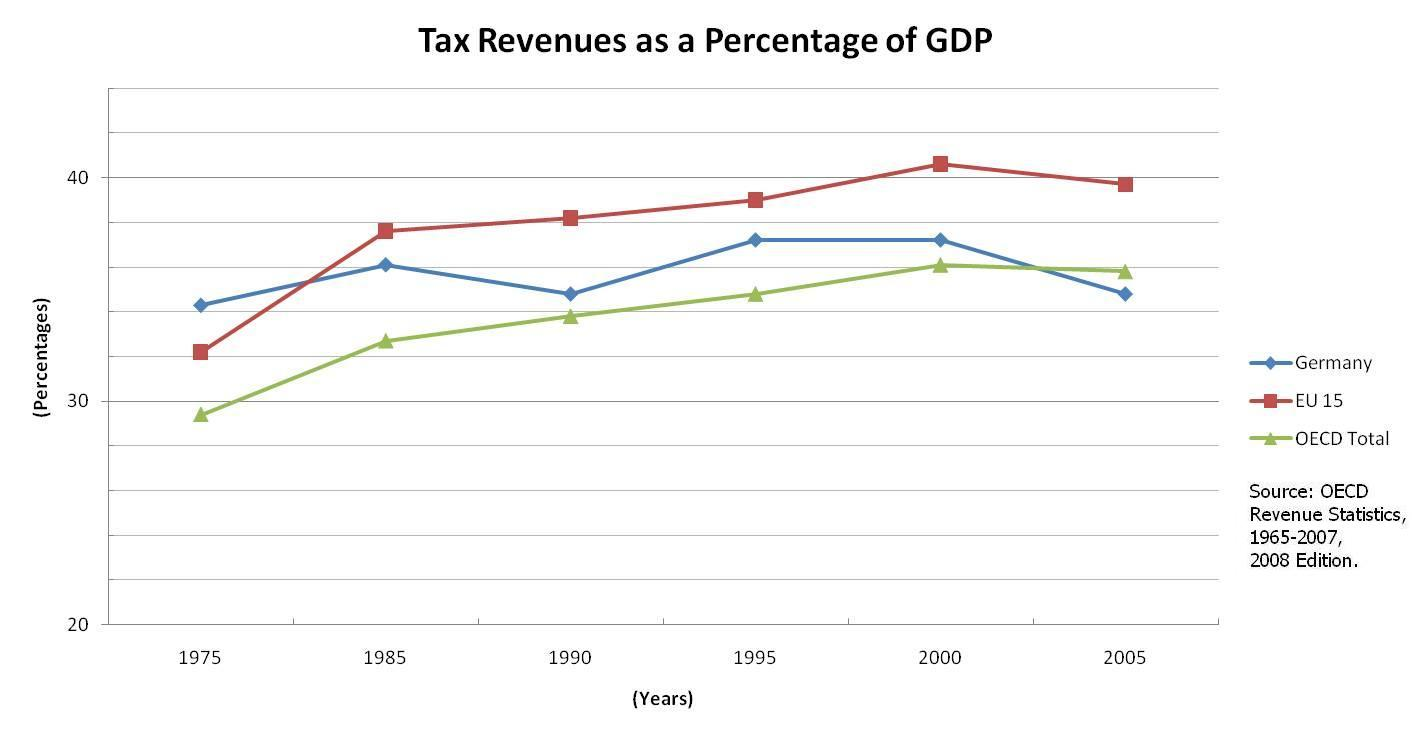
Tax revenues as a percentage of GDP for Germany in comparison to the OECD and the EU 15, with Germany's rates consistently lower than the latter

Under the German model, unions are organized at the industry level and co-exist with works councils at both the plant and company levels. These unions negotiate wage determination with employers' associations. The strength of this setup is the cooperation among unions and management councils. This is unique among Western countries, which have been marked by either substantial weakening of union powers (such as in the United States and United Kingdom since the 1980s), or consistent union conflict (such as in France and Italy, where unions have remained strong).

== Consensus model ==
As in relations between unions and employers, the German model also seeks to harmonize relations between regulatory bodies and affected parties, as well as between individual companies to prevent ruinous competition within the scope of applicable antitrust law. Considered an outgrowth of the non-confrontational culture of postwar Germany, finding a common denominator was often the main goal in such relationships.

== Vocational education and training ==
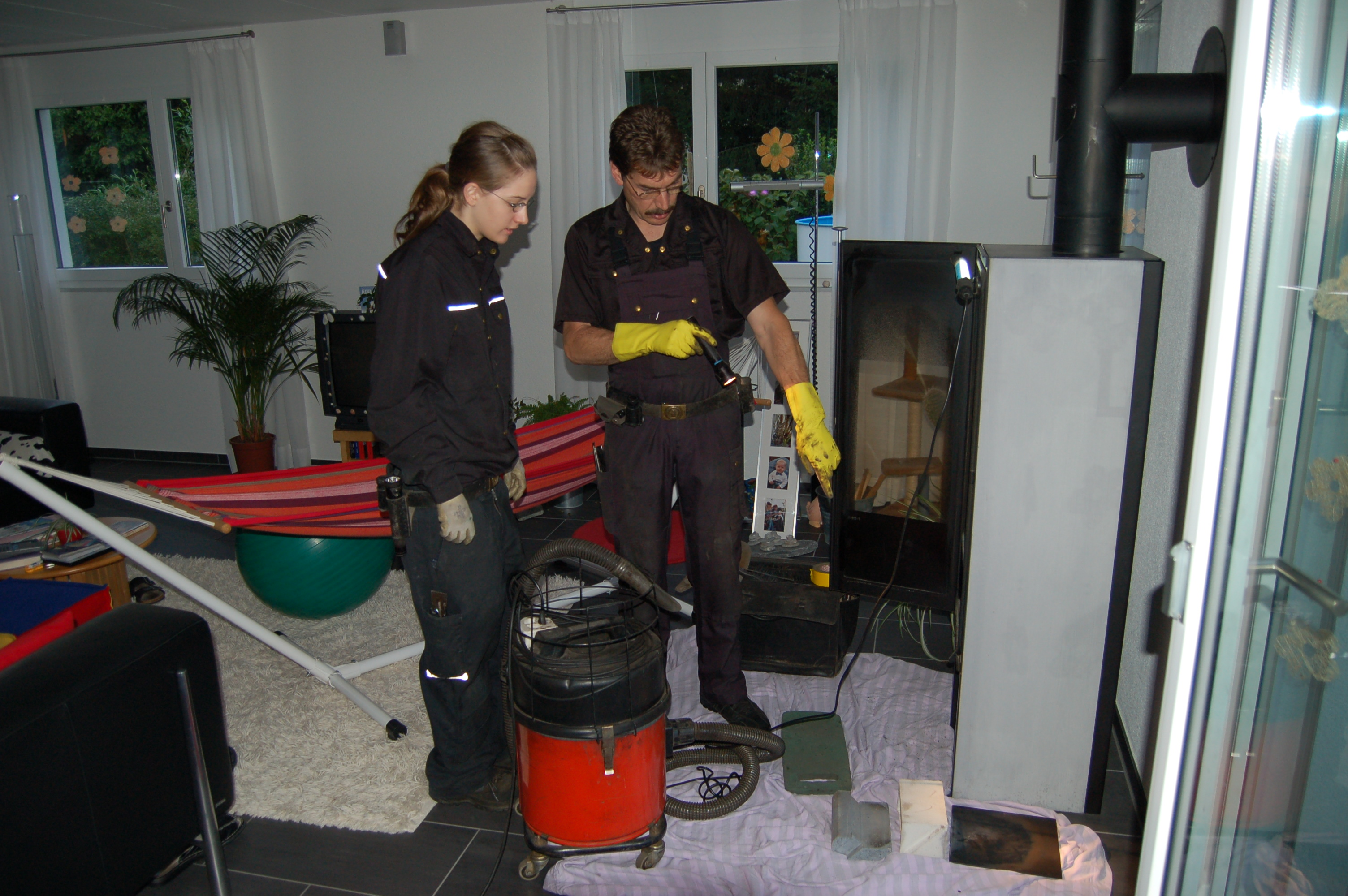
A master chimney sweep and apprentice in 2008

The system of vocational education is perhaps the most important component of the German model, and is still very prevalent in the German educational system. In Germany, there is a much heavier emphasis on apprenticeships for skilled positions, taught by expert worker-instructors. It has been made possible through long-term politics, focusing on establishing stronger links between the dual vocational education and training system and institutes of higher education, on improving integration into vocational training through basic skills and permeability and on establishing national coverage of branch-specific regional initial and continuing training centres.

As such, there is a lower percentage of university students in Germany when compared to other Western countries, and a much lower percentage of persons entering the workforce for on-the-job training. Vocational training is required for a large number of occupations. At the end of vocational training, a highly regarded certification qualification is awarded that is valid for a range of over 400 occupations. This is in stark difference to other European countries, where the number of controlled occupations is much smaller. Critics cite inflexibility of the school system as the main disadvantage. Some 60% of graduates change their profession within 10 years of graduation.

== Financial and industrial relations ==
German banks have a much larger role in shaping the industrial sector than those in other Western countries. Rather than simply collecting savings and investments and issuing loans, most German banks have large interests in the commercial sector. As such, many corporate boards offer seats to high-ranking German banking officials, whose banks are often investors in the corporation. As a result, they seek to promote long-term investment in the overall health of the companies they are working with.

== Future of the German model ==
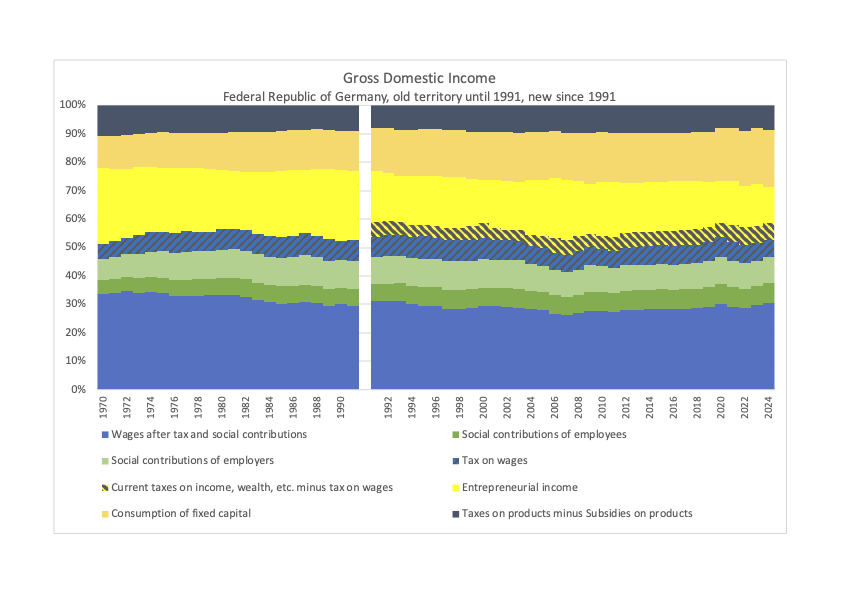
Components of gross national income

Since German reunification German prosperity has declined compared to pre-unification West German levels, and the German unemployment rate reached record levels: 12.6% (according to national definition) as of March 2, 2005, the highest rate since World War II. The failure of the German model to maintain standards of high performance has led experts to speculate about its demise, despite having been adopted successfully in other countries' corporations since its peak. Others see the relative decline as an unavoidable consequence of integrating the much less advanced GDR economy and 17 million new citizens, which necessitated a transfer of over 1.3 trillion Euros from west to east as of 2009.

Much of the political discourse regarding reforms in recent years revolved around the question of how to modify the German model (and the political conditions forming its framework) to sustain it in a globalised economy. Ex-Chancellor Gerhard Schröder's reforms, called "Agenda 2010", made some steps towards such a goal, but also brought with them much controversy. Nonetheless, after years of 'painful' reforms, the German economy seems to have got back on track; however, the wage share measured as compensation of employees as percentage of gross national income, was declining in Germany since the 1980s. Unemployment has fallen below 10% (according to national definition) for the first time in years and economic growth reached 2.7% in 2006. In June 2016, the unemployment rate was reported as 5.9% by the German Federal Employment Agency (Bundesagentur für Arbeit). The unemployment rate was reported for August 2025 as a percentage of the civilian labour force for Germany as a whole 6.4%. It ranged between 4.2% in Bavaria and 11.8% in the state of Bremen.

== Counter-argument: rise of the German model ==
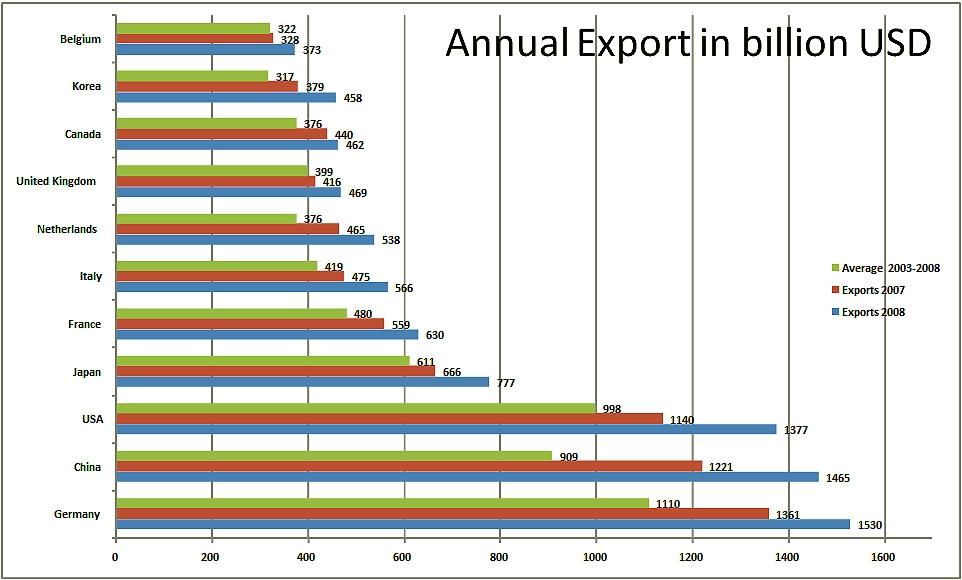
Annual exports of different countries

As of 2009 and with the worldwide economic downturn through the Great Recession, some analysts speculated that the German model of social capitalism is resurgent and is the most responsible economic system that still ensures the survival of the free market. With 2000s economic schemes and company abuses, such as in the Bernard Madoff scandal, the Enron scandal, and the 2008 financial crisis, the German model of a rigidly structured and regulated economy has become more attractive. From 2003 to 2008, Germany (a nation with only 80 million inhabitants) was the world's biggest exporter. In 2009, China (1.3 billion inhabitants) overtook Germany in exports. One of the reasons for this are the Hidden Champions as a result of the German Model. Germany's Hartz Reforms and a growing low-wage sector are believed to have weakened the core setup of this German Model.

== See also ==
- Economy of Germany
- Ordoliberalism
- Social market economy
