= Funemployment =

Term for having fun while unemployed

Funemployment is a colloquial reference to the portmanteau of having fun while being unemployed, typically while on unemployment benefits. People on funemployment use the time for self-discovery and self-care. Funemployment is more commonly utilized by younger workers.

Funemployment has been criticized as limiting people's career prospects. Long-term funemployment may negatively impact mental health.

Funemployment came to prominence following the COVID-19 pandemic and as a response to hustle culture and work-life balance.

== See also ==
- Critique of work
- Ergophobia
- Refusal of work
