= Ghent system =

System where unions handle welfare payments

The Ghent system is the name given to an arrangement in some countries whereby the main responsibility for welfare payments, especially unemployment benefits, is held by trade unions rather than a government agency. The system is named after the city of Ghent, Belgium, where it was first implemented. It is the predominant form of unemployment benefit in Denmark, Finland, Iceland and Sweden. Belgium has a hybrid or "quasi-Ghent" system, in which the government also plays a significant role in distributing benefits. In all of the above countries, unemployment funds held by unions or labour federations are regulated and/or partly subsidised by the national government concerned.

Because workers in many cases need to belong to a union to receive benefits, union membership is higher in countries with the Ghent system. Furthermore, the state benefit is a fixed sum, but the benefits from unemployment funds depend on previous earnings.

== Ghent system in Sweden ==
From January 2007, the Swedish state decreased its financial support to the unemployment funds (most of them union-run, a few funds aimed for small entrepreneurs and one independent fund), with the result being that membership fees to unemployment funds had to be raised considerably, and union density declined from 77% in 2006 to 71% in 2008. In January 2014 the fund fees were restored to about the same level as before 2007. In 2015 Swedish union density was 69% and the density of union unemployment funds 73% (75% if the independent Alfa fund is added).

== Ghent system in Czechoslovakia ==
The Ghent system in Czechoslovakia was adopted in 1925 mainly thanks to social democrats. It was largely opposed by the communist trade unions due to restrictions in work of communist red unions.
