= Rehn–Meidner model =

Economic and wage policy model

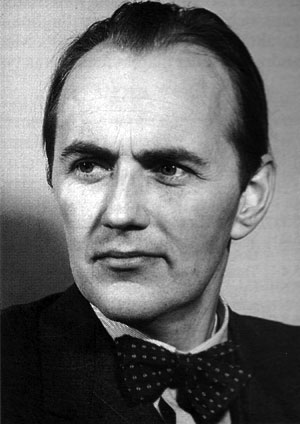
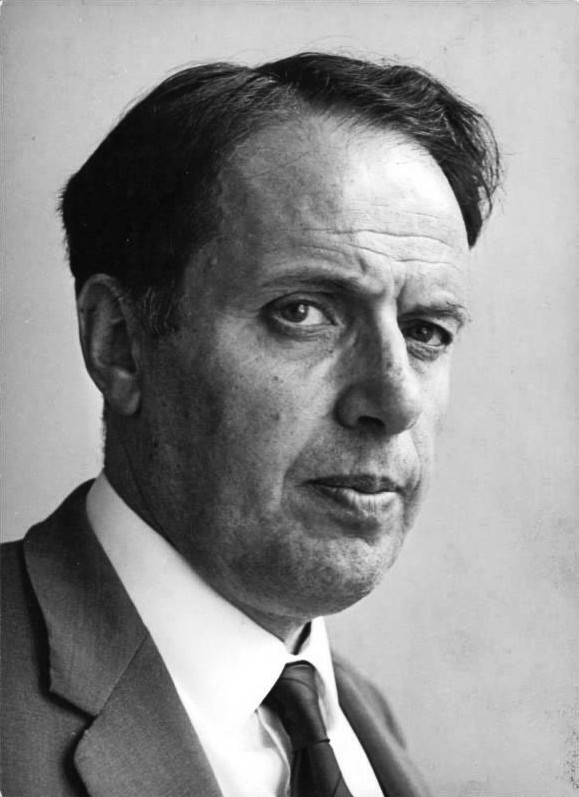
Gösta Rehn (1913–1996) and Rudolf Meidner (1914–2005)

The Rehn–Meidner model is an economic and wage policy model developed in 1951 by two economists at the research department of the Swedish Trade Union Confederation (LO), Gösta Rehn and Rudolf Meidner. The four main goals to be achieved were:

- Low inflation
- Full employment
- High growth
- Income equality

== Overview ==
The model is based upon an interaction between fiscal- and monetary policies, active labour market policies, and solidaristic wage policy. The purpose is to simultaneously achieve all four goals of the model.

Fiscal and monetary policies shall be restrictive in the medium term to ensure low inflation. The policies are particularly meant to prevent wage-price spirals by squeezing profit margins in the business sector.

Solidaristic wage policy will threaten the profitability of companies and industries with low productivity. To survive, these companies have to raise productivity by rationalization and innovation or leave the market. All of this will enhance productivity growth at the aggregate level and freed labour resources facilitating the expansion of high-productive companies and industries. Their expansion is also stimulated by the solidaristic wage policy. Without this policy, wages would have been higher in dynamic companies and industries leading to larger wage differentials and higher inflation.

In the Rehn-Meidner model, active labour market policy shall sustain full employment but also speed up the transfer of labour to dynamic companies and industries. Rehn argued for mobility-enhancing labor-market policies, including high unemployment benefits, based on a notion of "security by wings" rather than "security under shells." This aimed to make workers less dependent on a specific job, such that they would find new jobs as structural changes caused by productivity growth will reduce the need for workers in existing jobs. Rehn also recognized that high unemployment benefits may lead to longer job search periods, suggesting this would lead to more efficient labor markets by matching workers with jobs better fitting their skills and abilities; modern research has found evidence of this improved matching effect.

== Decline and legacy ==
In Sweden, by the mid-1960s, the Swedish Confederation of Trade Unions (LO) moved toward a preference for job security, and successfully lobbied the Swedish government to pass the Job Security Act of 1974. This effectively shifted Swedish macroeconomic policy from the Rehn-Meidner notion of "security by wings" to "security under shells." Further economic and political developments, including the oil supply crises of the 1970s and 1980s and increased international competition, pushed Sweden further from the Rehn-Meidner model and drew increasing focus onto pre-Keynesian economic-policy ideas.

== See also ==
- Nordic model
- Flexicurity
- Economic democracy
