= Jacques Bidet =

French philosopher, social theorist (born 1935)

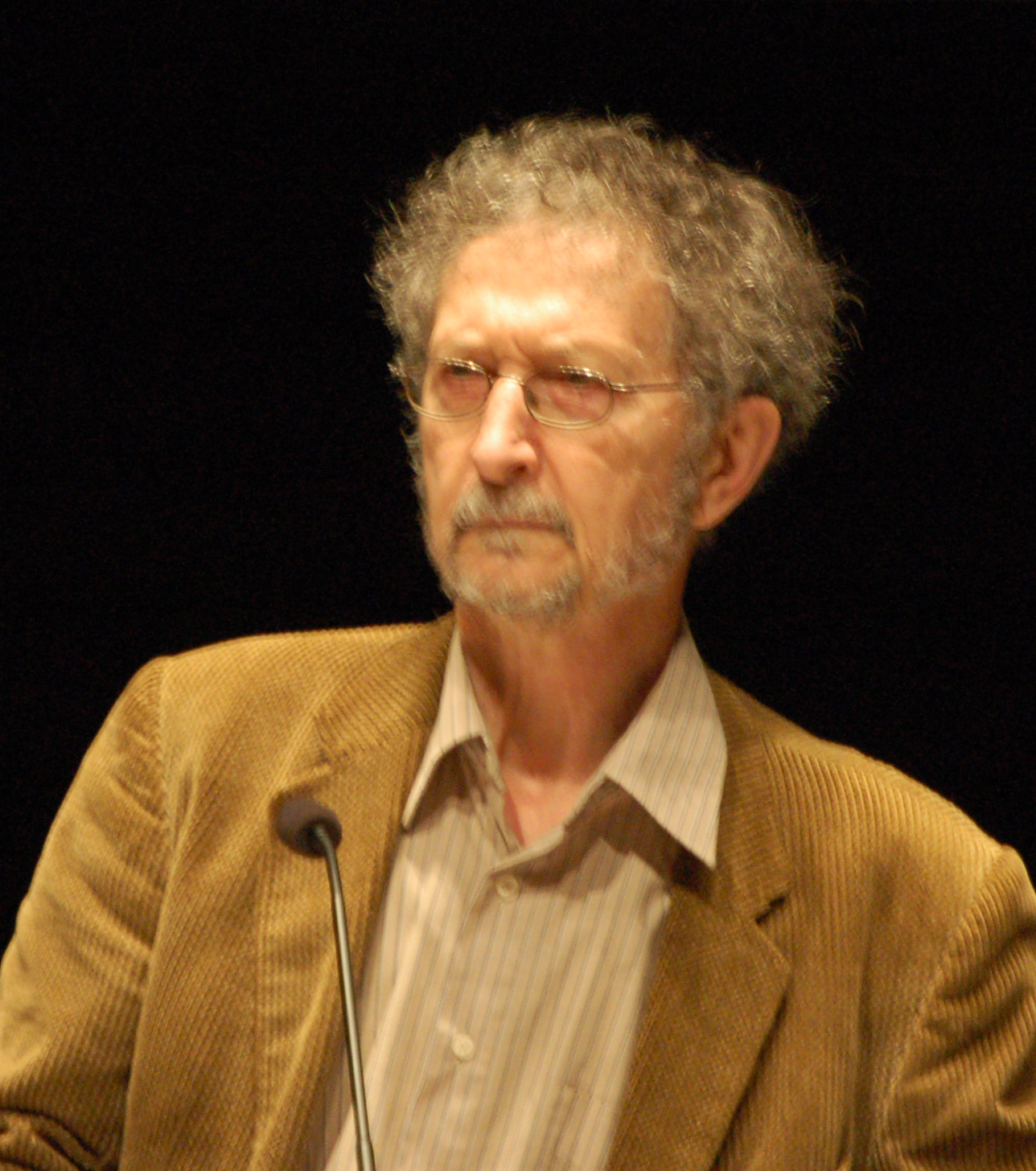
- Born: 1935 (age 90–91); France
- Occupations: Philosopher; social theorist
- Employers: Université de Paris X - Nanterre Writing career
- Subjects: Structuralism; classical Marxism

Jacques Bidet (French: [bidɛ]; born 1935) is a French philosopher and social theorist who is currently professor emeritus in the Philosophy Department at the Université de Paris X - Nanterre.

His works are mainly devoted to the construction of a theory of modern society under the name of Meta/structural theory (théorie méta/structurelle). Modern nation-states, as elements of world system, are structured on both market and organisation, supposedly rational mediations, as co-implied class factors. The philosophical, sociological, historical, legal-political and cultural aspects of this paradigm are developed in the sense of an Altermarxism, by contrast with classical Marxism.

In 1989, he founded with Jacques Texier the journal Actuel Marx (Presses Universitaires de France), and in 1995, the Congrès Marx International (Université de Paris X - Nanterre).

== Publications ==
=== French ===
- Que faire du Capital?, Klincksieck. 1985, 2° édition, PUF, 2000, 300 pp. Croatian, Japanese and Korean editions
- Bidet, J. (1990). Théorie de la modernité (Paris: PUF) 300 pp. Appeared in Spanish, Buenos Aires, Bellas Letras, 1993, in Italian, Roma, Laterza, 1993.
- Bidet, J. (1995). John Rawls et la théorie de la justice (Paris: PUF) 140 pp.
- Bidet, J. (1999). Théorie générale (Paris: PUF) 504 pp., Croatian edition (Disput, 2008, a revised shorter edition in 300 pp.), Chinese edition (Remnin Press, 2009).
- (ed. with Eustache Kouvelakis) Dictionnaire Marx Contemporain, PUF, 2001, 600 pp. Chinese edition (Remnin Press).
- Bidet, J. (2004). Explication et reconstruction du Capital (Paris: PUF) 320 pp. . Appeared in Spanish (LOM, Santiago, Chile) 2006, in Italian (Manifesto Libri, 2010), in Brazilian (EditoraUnicamp, 2010). To appear in Chinese (Social Science Academic Press).
- Bidet, J. and Duménil, G. (2007). Altermarxisme, un autre marxisme pour un autre monde (Paris: PUF) 300 pp. [Altermarxism, Another Marxism for another World]. Appeared in Spanish (Viejo Topo, 2009), in Polish (Dialog 2011), to appear in Chinese (Social Science Academic Press) and Korean.
- Bidet, J. (2011). L’État-monde, Libéralisme, Socialisme et Communisme à l’échelle mondiale, Refondation du marxisme (Paris: PUF) 320 p.
- Bidet, J. (2014). Foucault avec Marx (Paris: La fabrique)

=== English ===
- Bidet, J. (1990). A Theory of Modernity
- Bidet, J. (1995). John Rawls and the Theory of Justice
- Bidet, J. (1999). A General Theory of Modernity
- Bidet, J. (2004). Explanation and Reconstruction of Capital
- Bidet, J. (2006). Exploring Marx’s Capital (Boston: Leyden)
- Bidet, J. and Duménil, G. (2007). Altermarxism: Another Marxism for Another World
- Bidet, J. (2007). Critical Companion of Contemporary Marxism (Boston: Leyden)
- Bidet, J. (2011). World State, Liberalism, Socialism, and Communism at Global Scale: A Refoundation of Marxism
- Bidet, J. (2016). Foucault with Marx (London: Zed Books), trans. Steven Corcoran

=== Other translations ===
- Bidet, J. (2000 [1995]). John Rawls y la Teoría de la justicia Spanish edition (Barcelona)
