= Actuel Marx =

French marxist journal

Actuel Marx is a book series of Marxist studies, edited by Jacques Bidet, Gérard Duménil, and Emmanuel Renault. The series is published by the Presses universitaires de France with support from the Paris West University Nanterre La Défense and the Centre national de la recherche scientifique.

Actuel Marx organises the Congrès Marx international at the Paris West University every three years.

== See also ==
- Freudo-Marxism
