= Mexico and the International Monetary Fund =

Mexico joined the International Monetary Fund (IMF) in 1945. As of 2022, Mexico has had 18 numbers of arraignment with the IMF.

== History ==
Mexico joined the International Monetary Fund (IMF) on December 31, 1945, a year after the inception of the IMF in 1944. As of 2022, Mexico has 11816.7 million Special Drawing Rights(SDRs,) and a SDR quota of 8912.7 million. The leading director of Mexico on the IMF Executive Board is Pablo Moreno, with Alfonso Guerra, and José Andrés Romero serving as alternatives. Mexico's current governor is Rogelio Eduardo Ramirez de la O with Victoria Rodriguez Ceja serving as an alternative. As of 2022, Mexico holds 90,586 votes totaling 1.80% of total voting shares in the IMF. Mexico has the second greatest number of votes in Latin America.

As of 2022, Mexico has had 18 numbers of arraignment with the IMF since its membership in 1945.

=== Mexico in 1948 ===
Mexico recorded the largest trade balance deficit in the years 1946 and 1947, as a result of mass consumption during World War II, causing Banco de Mexico to practically lose all their accumulated reserves during the war. As a result, in July 1948, Mexico informed the IMF that it could no longer maintain the par value of the peso that was established without further financial support. Seeking financial assistance from both the IMF and the United States, mixed responses from both parties were received. The United States, decided that before agreeing to Mexico's request, the IMF would have to decide if the peso's par value was rational under their current circumstances. IMF executive board members doubted that the par value of the peso was reasonable, and whether it could be maintained. Following lack of IMF willingness to assist Mexico, the Bank of Mexico chose to float the peso up until June 1949, when Mexico established a new par value for the peso.

=== 1982 Mexican Debt Crisis ===
Mexico suffered from a massive debt crisis in 1982, resulting in the country requesting emergency financing from the IMF. Despite an early period of economic success, a decline in oil prices and an increase in US interest rates caused Mexico to double its debt from 1979 to 1982 causing an excess inflation rate of nearly 60% of its GDP. Recognizing Mexico's state of economic panic, secretary of finance Jesus Silva Herzog advised former IMF acting manager William Dale to send a mission to Mexico, in attempts to reach a solution. Negotiations began in August 1982 in order to secure appropriate funding assistance. However, on August 11, Mexico's commercial bank creditors no longer rolled over principle payments that were due on August 16, creating further economic difficulties for Mexico. As a result, Herzog flew to Washington, D.C. in order to meet with newly appointed IMF managing director Jacques de Larosière on August 13, 1982. IMF support was promised on the condition that Mexico find a solution to avoid further defaults on future debt payments.

Mexico successfully avoided future defaults on debt payments due to $7 billion of United States foreign aid that consisted of payments for advanced oil exports, and credit guarantees from both US Department of Agriculture and the Treasury Department's Exchange Stabilization Fund. The Bank for International Settlements also provided $1.85 billion, giving Mexico the short term funding in order to avoid becoming default. The programs and conditions that applied to the Mexican debt crisis lasted for three years. As a result of IMF involvement in Mexico following its economic crisis, many believe this marked the IMF's role of international crisis manager in Latin America.

Prior to the 1982 debt crisis, Mexico enjoyed a period of economic stability. This changed in the 1976 general election, when a change of president and an alteration of fiscal policy led to a recession. This led to the country being granted an economic stabilization program through the IMF, one of the first programs of this nature to be installed in Mexico by the IMF.

=== 1994 Mexican Peso Crisis ===
Following the crisis that occurred in 1982, Mexico with IMF assistance managed to reduce inflation by 160 percent by 1987 to 8 percent in 1993. Following this marginal success of Mexico's economy, 1994 would mark another crisis. 1994, a currency crisis in Mexico resulted in the devaluation of the Mexican peso, which resulted in a severe financial crisis. The currency crisis has been said to have been brought on by the new fiscal policies created by the government at the time. Critics blame past IMF financial assistance, as it is argued past IMF assistance during times of irresponsible financial management set expectations of IMF bailouts if a future economic crisis occurred. However, other explanations for the crisis have been argued such as political developments undermining trust in the government resulting in capital flight, or rise of US interest rates creating capital outflow contributing to the Mexican crisis. The Mexican Peso Crisis was extremely severe. At the same time, major organizations such as the International Monetary Fund, the World Bank, and other major banks, such as J.P. Morgan, praised the Mexican economic reforms of the time, claiming that the country's reforms were effective in bettering the economy.

In the month of December, the government changed Presidents and cabinet, which resulted in a transformation of fiscal policy. Within the course of December 15 - December 21, approximately US$5.5 billion left the country, and by the end of December, the Mexican peso's devaluation was 35%. This devaluation in the matter of a couple of weeks ultimately led to interventions by the IMF and other organizations affiliated with the group. In January 1995, the IMF entered the scene and laid out a 7.8 billion bailout package that would aid Mexico in overcoming the crisis. However, the United States stepped in and increased this rescue package to US$50 billion with the aid of private banks, the IMF, and the Bank for International Settlements. As a result, this marked the first international crisis of the 21st century, and a successful instance of IMF involvement in a financial crisis.

=== 2009 increased credit line ===
As of 2009, the Mexican government requested an increase in credit line from the IMF. This was approved by the IMF in the same year, increasing Mexico's credit line to US$47 billion. A notable feature about this increase is that it is one of the new arrangements under the new IMF lending reforms or the Flexible Credit Line. This increase was meant to ensure that Mexico would be able to prosper despite global financial crises, and the program would last solely a year. However, the program was renewed less than a year later on March 25, 2010. The flexible credit line (FCL) allowed Mexico to remain a reliable player internationally. However, the FCL did not prevent Mexico from having a record low GDP when compared to other Latin American countries. The 2008 financial crisis in the United States had a big impact on the Mexican economy because relations between both countries were close and friendly. Their friendly economic relationship was namely due to NAFTA, which is a free trade agreement in North America between the United States, Mexico, and Canada. The U.S./Mexico relationship was one of Mexico's greatest assets and allowed for Mexico to become one of the most important Latin American countries due to its increase in manufacturing factories and economic reforms. The FCL allowed Mexico to handle the pressures from other Latin American countries because with the financial and ideological support from the U.S., Mexico could be a formidable opponent. U.S. interests lie with Mexico because Mexico is a good indicator of the economies from other nearby countries in Latin America. In 2009, Mexico's increased credit line was sufficient to remain relatively stable.

=== Current day Mexico ===
Mexico's credit line has fluctuated since the 2009 agreement, rising to $88 billion in 2016 and decreasing to $74 billion in 2019. The most recent change in the Flexible Credit Line and the IMF occurred in 2021. The FCL, which is intended for economic crisis prevention and as an insurance policy, should anything happen within the economy was approved by the IMF in 2021 for a two-year plan valuing $50 billion. This change in arrangement marks the ninth FCL agreement, and is a considerable decline compared to the FCL agreement made in 2017 and 2019. The FCL in 2017 allowed for access to $86 billion, and in 2019 was valued at $61 billion. The decrease in FCL usage comes as a result of Mexican authorities requesting reductions in the limit. As a result, Mexican authorities are treating the new FCL arraignment as a "precautionary". Mexico has been lowering its FCL usage in response towards its economic growth and confidence in the reduction of financial risk over the years. Despite this, the FCL still serves an important function, and serves a safety net for Mexico's economy in case of economic crisis. Credit lines also decreased because U.S. President Donald Trump threatened to disband the North American Trade Agreement. The Mexican economy remains stable, with the peso at the same rate of inflation as years prior. Consumption has risen, which is projected to boost the economy by the end of 2019, despite the decrease in foreign investment. Since the 2009 agreement, Mexico's economy has become better able to handle economic surprises that could have been more detrimental. Mexico faces pressure from the IMF to reform its economic policy and make changes to the proposed budget by President Andrés Manuel López Obrador. The IMF is skeptical of President Obrador's projections regarding tax reforms and issues with Pemex.
