= Gérard Duménil =

French economist

Gérard Duménil (born 12 October 1942) is a French political economist. He is a former Research Director at the French National Centre for Scientific Research.

== Publications ==
- Gerard Duménil (1980). De la valeur aux prix de production (in French). Paris.
- Gerard Duménil (Winter 1983). "Beyond the Transformation Riddle: A Labor Theory of Value". Science & Society. 47 (4): 427–450. JSTOR 40402521.
