= List of snakes by common name =

This is a list of extant snakes, given by their common names. Note that the snakes are grouped by name, and in some cases the grouping may have no scientific basis.

== A ==
- Adder
  - Common adder
  - Death Adder
  - Desert death adder
  - Horned adder
  - Long-nosed adder
  - Many-horned adder
  - Mountain adder
  - Mud adder
  - Namaqua dwarf adder
  - Peringuey's adder
  - Puff adder
    - African puff adder
  - Rhombic night adder
  - Sand adder
    - Dwarf sand adder
    - Namib dwarf sand adder
  - Water adder
- Aesculapian snake
- Anaconda
  - Bolivian anaconda
  - De Schauensee's anaconda
  - Green anaconda
  - Yellow anaconda
- Arafura file snake
- Asp
  - European asp
  - Egyptian asp
- African beaked snake

== B ==
- Ball Python
- Bird snake
- Black-headed snake
- Mexican black kingsnake
- Black rat snake
- Black snake
  - Red-bellied black snake
- Blind snake
  - Brahminy blind snake
  - Texas blind snake
  - Western blind snake
- Boa
  - Abaco Island boa
  - Amazon tree boa
  - Boa constrictor
  - Cuban boa
  - Dumeril's boa
  - Dwarf boa
  - Emerald tree boa
  - Hogg Island boa
  - Jamaican boa
  - Madagascar ground boa
  - Madagascar tree boa
  - Puerto Rican boa
  - Rainbow boa
  - Red-tailed boa
  - Rosy boa
  - Rubber boa
  - Sand boa
  - Tree boa
- Boiga
- Boomslang
- Brown snake
  - Eastern brown snake
- Bull snake
- Bushmaster
- Dwarf beaked snake
- Rufous beaked snake

== C ==
- Canebrake
- Cantil
- Cascabel
- Cat-eyed snake
  - Banded cat-eyed snake
  - Green cat-eyed snake
- Cat snake
  - Andaman cat snake
  - Beddome's cat snake
  - Dog-toothed cat snake
  - Forsten's cat snake
  - Gold-ringed cat snake
  - Gray cat snake
  - Many-spotted cat snake
  - Nicobar cat snake
  - Sri Lanka cat snake
  - Tawny cat snake
- Chicken snake
- Coachwhip snake
- Cobra
  - Andaman cobra
  - Arabian cobra
  - Asian cobra
  - Banded water cobra
  - Black-necked cobra
  - Black-necked spitting cobra
  - Black tree cobra
  - Burrowing cobra
  - Cape cobra
  - Caspian cobra
  - Chinese cobra
  - Cobra de capello
  - Congo water cobra
  - Common cobra
  - Eastern water cobra
  - Egyptian cobra
  - Equatorial spitting cobra
  - False cobra
  - False water cobra
  - Forest cobra
  - Gold tree cobra
  - Indian cobra
  - Indochinese spitting cobra
  - Javan spitting cobra
  - King cobra
  - Mandalay cobra
  - Monocled cobra
  - Monoculate cobra
  - Mozambique spitting cobra
  - North Philippine cobra
  - Nubian spitting cobra
  - Philippine cobra
  - Red spitting cobra
  - Rinkhals cobra
  - Shield-nosed cobra
  - Sinai desert cobra
  - Southern Indonesian spitting cobra
  - Southern Philippine cobra
  - Southwestern black spitting cobra
  - Snouted cobra
  - Spectacled cobra
  - Spitting cobra
  - Storm water cobra
  - Thai cobra
  - Taiwan cobra
  - West African brown spitting cobra
  - White-lipped cobra
  - Yellow cobra
  - Zebra spitting cobra
- Collett's snake
- Congo snake
- Copperhead
  - American copperhead
  - Australian copperhead
- Coral snake
  - Arizona coral snake
  - Beddome's coral snake
  - Brazilian coral snake
  - Cape coral snake
  - Eastern coral snake
  - False coral snake
  - Harlequin coral snake
  - High Woods coral snake
  - Malayan long-glanded coral snake
  - Texas Coral Snake
  - Western coral snake
- Corn snake
  - South eastern corn snake
- Cottonmouth
- Crowned snake
- Cuban wood snake

== E ==
- Eastern hognose snake
- Egg-eater
  - Indian egg-eater
- Eyelash viper
- Eastern coral snake

== F ==
- Fer-de-lance
- Fierce snake
- Fishing snake
- Flying snake
  - Golden tree snake
  - Indian flying snake
  - Moluccan flying snake
  - Ornate flying snake
  - Paradise flying snake
  - Twin-Barred tree snake
  - Banded Flying Snake
- Fox snake, three species of Pantherophis
- Forest flame snake

== G ==
- Garter snake
  - Checkered garter snake
  - Common garter snake
  - San Francisco garter snake
  - Texas garter snake
- Glossy snake
- Gopher snake
  - Cape gopher snake
- Grass snake
- Green snake
  - Rough green snake
  - Smooth green snake
- Ground snake
  - Common ground snake
  - Three-lined ground snake
  - Western ground snake

== H ==
- Habu
  - Himehabu
  - Okinawan habu
  - Sakishima habu
  - Tokara habu
- Harlequin snake
  - Elaps harlequin snake
- Herald snake
- Hognose snake
  - Blonde hognose snake
  - Dusty hognose snake
  - Eastern hognose snake
  - Jan's hognose snake
  - Giant Malagasy hognose snake
  - Mexican hognose snake
  - Plains hognose snake
  - Ringed hognose snake
  - South American hognose snake
  - Southern hognose snake
  - Speckled hognose snake
  - Tri-color hognose snake
  - Western hognose snake
- Hoop snake
- Hundred pacer

== I ==
- Ikaheka snake
- Indigo snake

== J ==
- Jamaican Tree Snake
- Jararacussu

== K ==
- Keelback
  - Andrea's keelback
  - Asian keelback
  - Assam keelback
  - Black-striped keelback
  - Buff striped keelback
  - Burmese keelback
  - Checkered keelback
  - Common keelback
  - Hill keelback
  - Himalayan keelback
  - Khasi Hills keelback
  - Modest keelback
  - Nicobar Island keelback
  - Nilgiri keelback
  - Orange-collared keelback
  - Red-necked keelback
  - Sikkim keelback
  - Speckle-bellied keelback
  - Tiger keelback
  - Wall's keelback
  - White-lipped keelback
  - Wynaad keelback
  - Yunnan keelback
- King brown
- King cobra
- King snake
  - California kingsnake
  - Desert kingsnake
  - Grey-banded kingsnake
  - North eastern king snake
  - Prairie kingsnake
  - Scarlet kingsnake
  - Speckled kingsnake
- Krait
  - Banded krait
  - Blue krait
  - Black krait
  - Burmese krait
  - Ceylon krait
  - Indian krait
  - Lesser black krait
  - Malayan krait
  - Many-banded krait
  - Northeastern hill krait
  - Red-headed krait
  - Sind krait
  - South Andaman krait
  - Suzhen's krait

== L ==
- Large shield snake
- Lancehead
  - Common lancehead
- Lora
  - Grey Lora
- Lyre snake
  - Baja California lyresnake
  - Central American lyre snake
  - Texas lyre snake
  - Eastern lyre snake

== M ==
- Machete savane
- Mamba
  - Black mamba
  - Green mamba
    - Eastern green mamba
    - Western green mamba
- Mamushi
- Mangrove snake
- Milk snake
- Moccasin snake
- Montpellier snake
- Mud snake
  - Eastern mud snake
  - Western mud snake
- Mussurana

== N ==
- Night snake
  - Cat-eyed night snake
  - Texas night snake
  - Nichell snake
  - Narrowhead Garter Snake
- Nose-horned viper
  - Rhinoceros viper
  - Vipera ammodytes

== P ==
- Parrot snake
  - Mexican parrot snake
- Patchnose snake
- Perrotet's shieldtail snake
- Pine snake
- Pipe snake
  - Asian pipe snake
  - Dwarf pipe snake
  - Red-tailed pipe snake
- Python
  - African rock python
  - Amethystine python
  - Angolan python
  - Australian scrub python
  - Ball python
  - Bismarck ringed python
  - Black headed python
  - Blood python
  - Boelen python
  - Borneo short-tailed python
  - Bredl's python
  - Brown water python
  - Burmese python
  - Calabar python
  - Western carpet python
    - Centralian carpet python
    - Coastal carpet python
    - Inland carpet python
    - Jungle carpet python
    - New Guinea carpet python
    - Northwestern carpet python
    - Southwestern carpet python
  - Children's python
  - Dauan Island water python
  - Desert woma python
  - Diamond python
  - Flinders python
  - Green tree python
  - Halmahera python
  - Indian python
  - Indonesian water python
  - Macklot's python
  - Moluccan python
  - Oenpelli python
  - Olive python
  - Papuan python
  - Pygmy python
  - Red blood python
  - Reticulated python
    - Kayaudi dwarf reticulated python
    - Selayer reticulated python
  - Rough-scaled python
  - Royal python
  - Savu python
  - Spotted python
  - Stimson's python
  - Sumatran short-tailed python
  - Tanimbar python
  - Timor python
  - Wetar Island python
  - White-lipped python
    - Brown white-lipped python
    - Northern white-lipped python
    - Southern white-lipped python
  - Woma python
    - Western woma python

== Q ==
- Queen snake

== R ==
- Racer
  - Bimini racer
  - Buttermilk racer
  - Eastern racer
  - Eastern yellowbelly sad racer
  - Mexican racer
  - Southern black racer
  - Tan racer
  - West Indian racer
- Raddysnake
  - Southwestern blackhead snake
- Rat snake
  - Baird's rat snake
  - Beauty rat snake
  - Great Plains rat snake
  - Green rat snake
  - Japanese forest rat snake
  - Japanese rat snake
  - King rat snake
  - Mandarin rat snake
  - Persian rat snake
  - Red-backed rat snake
  - Twin-spotted rat snake
  - Yellow-striped rat snake
  - Manchurian Black Water Snake
- Rattlesnake
  - Arizona black rattlesnake
  - Aruba rattlesnake
  - Chihuahuan ridge-nosed rattlesnake
  - Coronado Island rattlesnake
  - Durango rock rattlesnake
  - Dusky pigmy rattlesnake
  - Eastern diamondback rattlesnake
  - Grand Canyon rattlesnake
  - Great Basin rattlesnake
  - Hopi rattlesnake
  - Lance-headed rattlesnake
  - Long-tailed rattlesnake
  - Massasauga rattlesnake
  - Mexican green rattlesnake
  - Mexican west coast rattlesnake
  - Midget faded rattlesnake
  - Mojave rattlesnake
  - Northern black-tailed rattlesnake
  - Oaxacan small-headed rattlesnake
  - Rattler
  - Red diamond rattlesnake
  - Southern Pacific rattlesnake
  - Southwestern speckled rattlesnake
  - Tancitaran dusky rattlesnake
  - Tiger rattlesnake
  - Timber rattlesnake
  - Tropical rattlesnake
  - Twin-spotted rattlesnake
  - Uracoan rattlesnake
  - Western diamondback rattlesnake
- Ribbon snake
- Rinkhals
- River jack

== S ==
- Sea snake
  - Annulated sea snake
  - Beaked sea snake
  - Dubois's sea snake
  - Hardwicke's sea snake
  - Hook Nosed Sea Snake
  - Olive sea snake
  - Pelagic sea snake
  - Stoke's sea snake
  - Yellow-banded sea snake
  - Yellow-bellied sea snake
  - Yellow-lipped sea snake
- Shield-tailed snake
- Sidewinder
  - Colorado desert sidewinder
  - Mojave desert sidewinder
  - Sonoran sidewinder
- Small-eyed snake
- Smooth snake
  - Brazilian smooth snake
  - European smooth snake
- Stiletto snake
- Striped snake
  - Japanese striped snake
- Sunbeam snake

== T ==
- Taipan
  - Central ranges taipan
  - Coastal taipan
  - Inland taipan
  - Paupan taipan
- Tentacled snake
- Tic polonga
- Tiger snake
  - Chappell Island tiger snake
  - Common tiger snake
  - Down's tiger snake
  - Eastern tiger snake
  - King Island tiger snake
  - Krefft's tiger snake
  - Peninsula tiger snake
  - Tasmanian tiger snake
  - Western tiger snake
- Tigre snake
- Tree snake
  - Blanding's tree snake
  - Blunt-headed tree snake
  - Brown tree snake
  - Long-nosed tree snake
  - Many-banded tree snake
  - Northern tree snake
- Trinket snake
  - Black-banded trinket snake
- Twig snake
  - African twig snake
- Twin Headed King Snake
- Titanoboa

== U ==
- Urutu

== V ==
- Vine snake
  - Asian Vine Snake, Whip Snake
  - American Vine Snake
  - Mexican vine snake
- Viper
  - Asp viper
  - Bamboo viper
  - Bluntnose viper
  - Brazilian mud Viper
  - Burrowing viper
  - Bush viper
    - Great Lakes bush viper
    - Hairy bush viper
    - Nitsche's bush viper
    - Rough-scaled bush viper
    - Spiny bush viper
  - Carpet viper
  - Crossed viper
  - Cyclades blunt-nosed viper
  - Eyelash viper
  - False horned viper
  - Fea's viper
  - Fifty pacer
  - Gaboon viper
  - Hognosed viper
  - Horned desert viper
  - Horned viper
  - Jumping viper
  - Kaznakov's viper
  - Leaf-nosed viper
  - Leaf viper
  - Levant viper
  - Long-nosed viper
  - McMahon's viper
  - Mole viper
  - Nose-horned viper
    - Rhinoceros viper
    - Vipera ammodytes
  - Palestine viper
  - Pallas' viper
  - Palm viper
    - Amazonian palm viper
    - Black-speckled palm-pitviper
    - Eyelash palm-pitviper
    - Green palm viper
    - Mexican palm-pitviper
    - Guatemalan palm viper
    - Honduran palm viper
    - Siamese palm viper
    - Side-striped palm-pitviper
    - Yellow-lined palm viper
  - Pit viper
    - Banded pitviper
    - Bamboo pitviper
    - Barbour's pit viper
    - Black-tailed horned pit viper
    - Bornean pitviper
    - Brongersma's pitviper
    - Brown spotted pitviper
    - Cantor's pitviper
    - Elegant pitviper
    - Eyelash pit viper
    - Fan-Si-Pan horned pitviper
    - Flat-nosed pitviper
    - Godman's pit viper
    - Green tree pit viper
    - Habu pit viper
    - Hagen's pitviper
    - Horseshoe pitviper
    - Jerdon's pitviper
    - Kanburian pit viper
    - Kaulback's lance-headed pitviper
    - Kham Plateau pitviper
    - Large-eyed pitviper
    - Malabar rock pitviper
    - Malayan pit viper
    - Mangrove pit viper
    - Mangshan pitviper
    - Motuo bamboo pitviper
    - Nicobar bamboo pitviper
    - Philippine pitviper
    - Pointed-scaled pit viper
    - Red-tailed bamboo pitviper
    - Schultze's pitviper
    - Stejneger's bamboo pitviper
    - Sri Lankan pit viper
    - Temple pit viper
    - Tibetan bamboo pitviper
    - Tiger pit viper
    - Undulated pit viper
    - Wagler's pit viper
    - Wirot's pit viper
  - Portuguese viper
  - Rhinoceros viper
  - River jack
  - Russell's viper
  - Sand viper
  - Saw-scaled viper
  - Schlegel's viper
  - Sedge viper
  - Sharp-nosed viper
  - Snorkel viper
  - Temple viper
  - Tree viper
    - Chinese tree viper
    - Guatemalan tree viper
    - Hutton's tree viper
    - Indian tree viper
    - Large-scaled tree viper
    - Malcolm's tree viper
    - Nitsche's tree viper
    - Pope's tree viper
    - Rough-scaled tree viper
    - Rungwe tree viper
    - Sumatran tree viper
    - White-lipped tree viper
  - Ursini's viper
  - Western hog-nosed viper

== W ==
- Wart snake
- Water moccasin
- Water snake
  - Bocourt's water snake
  - Northern water snake
- Whip snake
  - Long-nosed whip snake
- Wolf snake
  - African wolf snake
  - Barred wolf snake
- Worm snake
  - Common worm snake
  - Longnosed worm snake
- Wutu

== Y ==
- Yarara

== Z ==
- Zebra snake

== See also ==
- List of snakes, overview of snake families and genera.
- List of reptiles, overview of reptile orders and families.
