= Tree viper =

Tree viper may refer to:

- Trimeresurus stejnegeri or Chinese tree viper, a venomous pitviper species found in India Nepal, Burma, Thailand, China and Taiwan
- Trimeresurus gramineus or Indian tree viper, a venomous pitviper species found only in southern India
- Trimeresurus macrolepis or large-scaled tree viper, a venomous pitviper species found in the mountains of southern India
- Trimeresurus malcolmi or Malcolm's tree viper, a venomous pitviper subspecies found in East Malaysia
- Trimeresurus popeiorum or Pope's tree viper, a venomous pitviper species found in northern India, Southeast Asia and parts of Indonesia
- Trimeresurus sumatranus or Sumatran tree viper, a venomous pitviper species found in Thailand, Malaysia and Indonesia
- Trimeresurus albolabris or white-lipped tree viper, a venomous pitviper species found in Southeast Asia
- Tropidolaemus huttoni or Hutton's tree viper, a venomous pitviper species found in southern India
- Atheris hispida or rough-scaled tree viper, a venomous species found in Central Africa
- Atheris nitschei or Nitsche's tree viper, a venomous species found in Africa from Uganda and adjacent DR Congo in the north to northern Malawi in the south
- Atheris rungweensis or Rungwe tree viper, a venomous subspecies found in Africa in Tanzania, Zambia and Malawi
- Atheris squamigera or Hallowell's green tree viper, a venomous species found in west and central Africa
- Atheris chlorechis or West African tree viper, a venomous species found in west Africa
