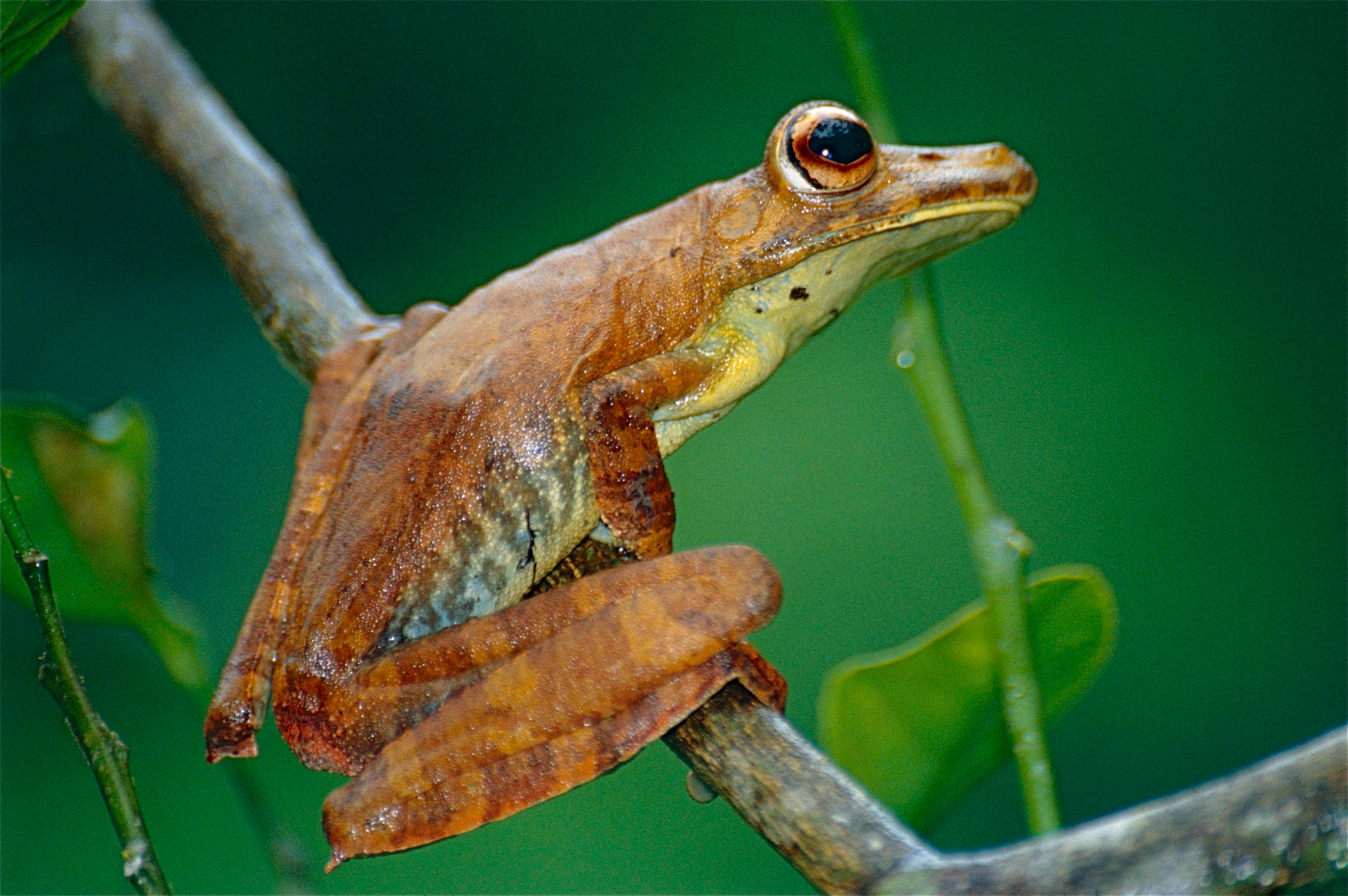

Conservation status
- Least Concern (IUCN 3.1)

Scientific classification
- Kingdom: Animalia
- Phylum: Chordata
- Class: Amphibia
- Order: Anura
- Family: Hylidae
- Genus: Boana
- Species: B. boans

Binomial name
- Boana boans (Linnaeus, 1758)

Synonyms
- List: Rana boans Linnaeus, 1758; Rana maxima Laurenti, 1768; Rana palmata Lacépède, 1788; Rana palmata Bonnaterre, 1789; Calamita maximus Schneider, 1799; Calamita boans Schneider, 1799; Hyla boans Daudin, 1800; Hyla palmata Latreille in Sonnini de Manoncourt and Latreille, 1801; Hyla maxima Oken, 1816; Calamita palmatus Merrem, 1820; Hypsiboas palmata Wagler, 1830; Hypsiboas palmatus Tschudi, 1838; Lobipes palmata Fitzinger, 1843; Cinclidium granulatum Cope, 1867; Hyla lactea Lönnberg, 1896; Hyla daudini Lutz, 1973; Hypsiboas boans Faivovich et al, 2005

= Rusty tree frog =

Species of amphibian

The rusty tree frog (Boana boans), also known as the giant gladiator treefrog, is a species of frog in the family Hylidae found in South America and Panama. Its natural habitats are subtropical or tropical moist lowland forests, rivers, and intermittent freshwater marshes. In some areas, it is sympatric with H. rosenbergi.

== Names ==
It is called ukato in the Kwaza language of Rondônia, Brazil.
