= Copperhead (comics) =

Copperhead, in comics, may refer to:

- Copperhead (DC Comics), two characters of that name published by DC Comics
- Copperhead (Marvel Comics), three characters of that name published by Marvel Comics
- Copperhead (Image Comics), an ongoing space Western series published by Image Comics

== See also ==
- Copperhead (disambiguation)
