= Trimeresurus sabahi barati =

Conservation status
- Least Concern (IUCN 3.1)

Scientific classification
- Kingdom: Animalia
- Phylum: Chordata
- Class: Reptilia
- Order: Squamata
- Suborder: Serpentes
- Family: Viperidae
- Genus: Trimeresurus
- Species: T. sabahi
- Subspecies: T. s. barati

Trinomial name
- Trimeresurus sabahi barati Regenass & Kramer, 1981

Synonyms
- Trimeresurus popeorum barati Regenass & Kramer, 1981; Trimeresurus gramineus barati – Welch, 1988; Trimeresurus popeorum barati – Golay et al., 1993; Trimeresurus barati – Vogel et al., 2004; Popeia popeiorum barati – Sanders et al., 2006; Trimeresurus barati – David et al., 2009; Trimeresurus (Popeia) barati – David et al., 2011

Subspecies of snake

Trimeresurus sabahi barati, commonly known as the Sumatran green pit viper or the Barat bamboo pitviper, is a subspecies of Trimeresurus sabahi. The IUCN Red List treats it as a distinct species, and others have considered it subspecies of Trimeresurus popeiorum or Trimeresurus gramineus. It is endemic to Sumatra (Indonesia), including some nearby smaller islands.

== Description ==
The scalation includes 17–19 rows of dorsal scales at midbody, 142–157/146–160 ventral scales in males/females, 62–72/55–58 subcaudal scales in males/females, and 9–11 supralabial scales.

== Geographic range ==
Found in Indonesia on Sumatra and in the Mentawai Archipelago. The type locality given is "Solok, Sumatra".
