= Puff adder (disambiguation) =

Puff adder is the common name of several snake species:

- Bitis arietans, a venomous snake species found in Africa and the southern Arabian Peninsula
- Bitis, any other member of this genus
- Heterodon, a genus of harmless North American colubrid snakes commonly known as hognose snakes

Puff adder may also refer to:

- Puff Adder (character), a mutant supervillain in the Marvel Universe

== See also ==
- Pofadder (disambiguation)
