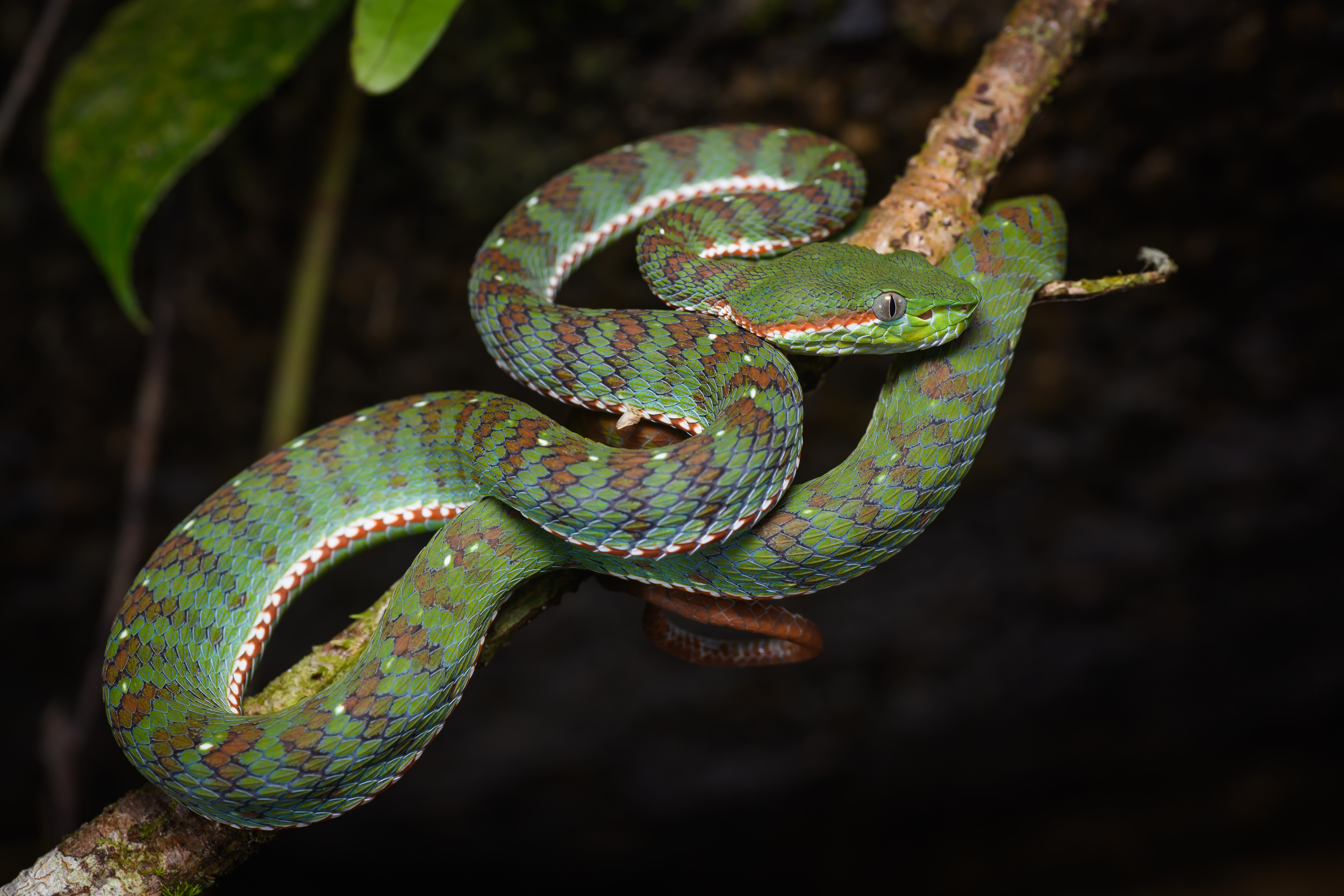
- Trimeresurus sabahi fucatus

Conservation status
- Least Concern (IUCN 3.1)

Scientific classification
- Kingdom: Animalia
- Phylum: Chordata
- Class: Reptilia
- Order: Squamata
- Suborder: Serpentes
- Family: Viperidae
- Genus: Trimeresurus
- Species: T. sabahi

Binomial name
- Trimeresurus sabahi Regenass & Kramer, 1981

Synonyms
- Trimeresurus popeorum sabahi Regenass & Kramer, 1981; Trimeresurus gramineus sabahi – Welch, 1988; Trimeresurus popeorum sabahi – Golay et al., 1993; Trimeresurus popeiorum sabahi – Gumprecht et al., 2004; Trimeresurus sabahi – Vogel et al., 2004; Popeia sabahi – Creer et al., 2006; Trimeresurus (Popeia) sabahi – Vogel et al., 2011

= Trimeresurus sabahi =

Species of snake

Trimeresurus sabahi, commonly known as the Sabah pit viper or Sabah bamboo pitviper, is a venomous pitviper species. If defined narrowly, it is endemic to the island of Borneo. If defined more broadly, it consists of five subspecies found in Southeast Asia.

== Subspecies ==
There are five subspecies:

- Trimeresurus sabahi barati Regenass & Kramer, 1981 – Sumatra, Mentawai Archipelago (Indonesia)
- T. s. buniana Grismer, Grismer & McGuire, 2006 – Tioman Island (Malaysia)
- T. s. fucatus Vogel, David & Pauwels, 2004 – Malay Peninsula (southern Myanmar, Thailand, West Malaysia)

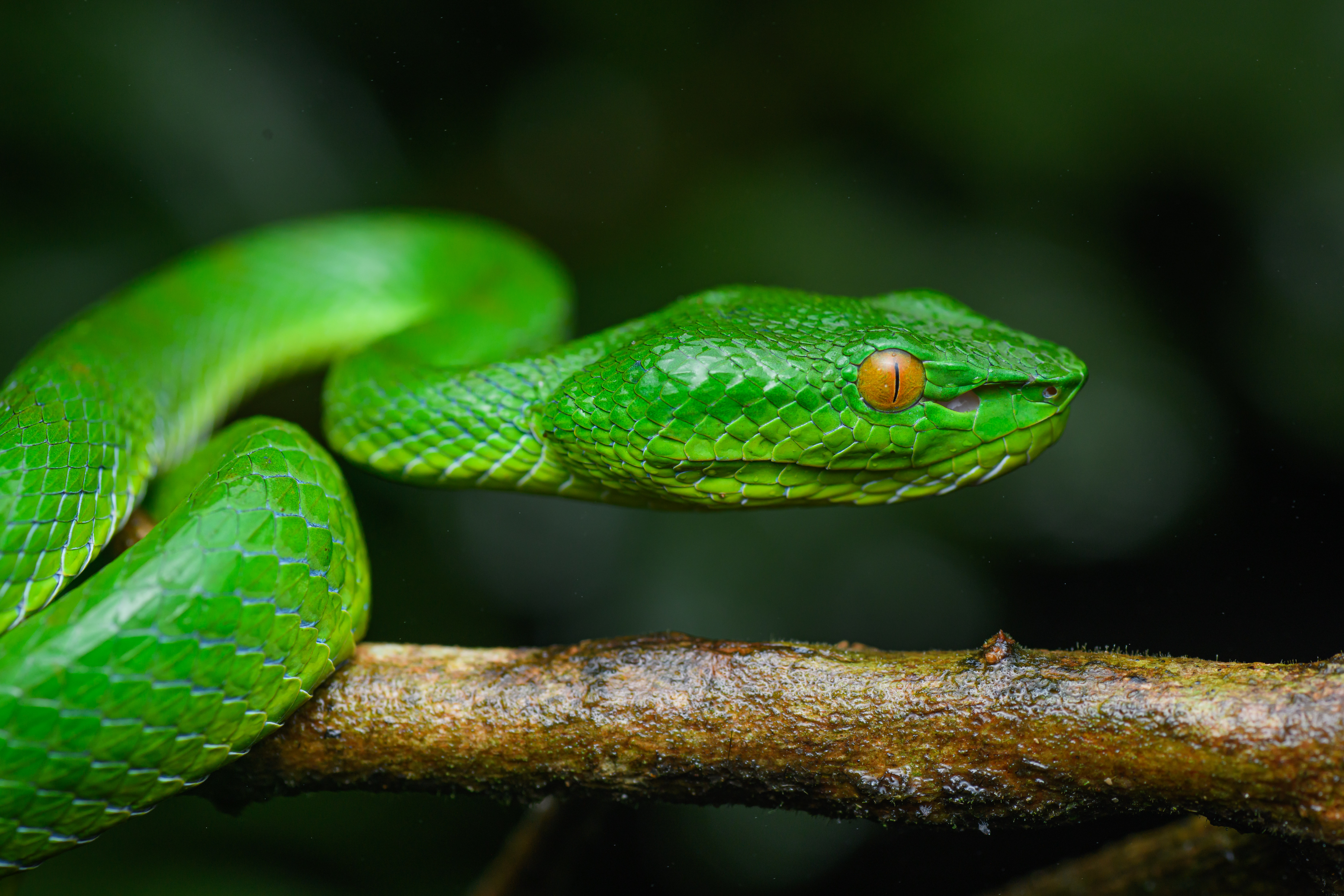
T. s fucatus

- T. s. sabahi Regenass & Kramer, 1981 – northern Borneo (Malaysia)
- T. s. toba David, Petri, Vogel & Doria, 2009 – Sumatra

IUCN treats these as full species, respectively T. barati, T. buniana, T. fucatus, and T. toba, restricting T. sabahi to the nominotypical subspecies.

== Description ==
Adults may attain a snout-vent length (SVL) of 62 cm (24 in).

Dorsally, it is uniform green, without crossbars. Ventrally it is pale green. There is narrow bicolor stripe on the first one and a half dorsal scale rows. In males this stripe is rust-colored or red below, and it is white above. In females it is yellow or white. The iris of the eye is red or orange in adults of both sexes, but in young specimens may be yellowish-green. There are no markings behind the eye.

The scalation includes 21 (23) rows of dorsal scales at midbody, 149–157/148–156 ventral scales in males/females or 148–159 in general, 72–76/59–65 subcaudal scales in males/females, and 9–11 supralabial scales (9–10 with the third being the largest).

== Habitat ==
In Borneo, it inhabits mountainous regions at altitudes from 1,000 m (3,300 ft) to 1,150 m (3,770 ft), where it is commonly found on branches of shrubs and other low vegetation.

== Reproduction ==
The reproductive biology of this species is unknown.
