= Keelback =

Keelback may refer to any of the following snake genera:

- Amphiesma
- Amphiesmoides, a monotypic genus in the Colubridae with its sole representative, the white-eyed keelback, Amphiesmoides ornaticeps
- Atretium, a monotypic genus in the Colubridae with its sole representative, the split keelback, Atretium schistosum
- Fowlea
- Hebius
- Rhabdophis
- Helicops
- Herpetoreas
- Opisthotropis
- Pseudagkistrodon, a monotypic genus in the Colubridae with its sole representative, the red keelback, Pseudagkistrodon rudis
- Trimerodytes
- Tropidonophis
- Xenochrophis

== See also ==
- Limacidae, the keelback slug
