= Bamboo viper =

Bamboo viper may refer to:

- Trimeresurus stejnegeri, a.k.a. the Chinese green tree viper, Chinese bamboo pit viper, a venomous pitviper species found in India, Nepal, Burma, Thailand, China and Taiwan
- Trimeresurus gramineus, a.k.a. the bamboo pit viper, a venomous species found only in southern India
- Trimeresurus popeiorum, a.k.a. the Pope's bamboo pit viper, a venomous pitviper species found in northern India, Southeast Asia and parts of Indonesia
