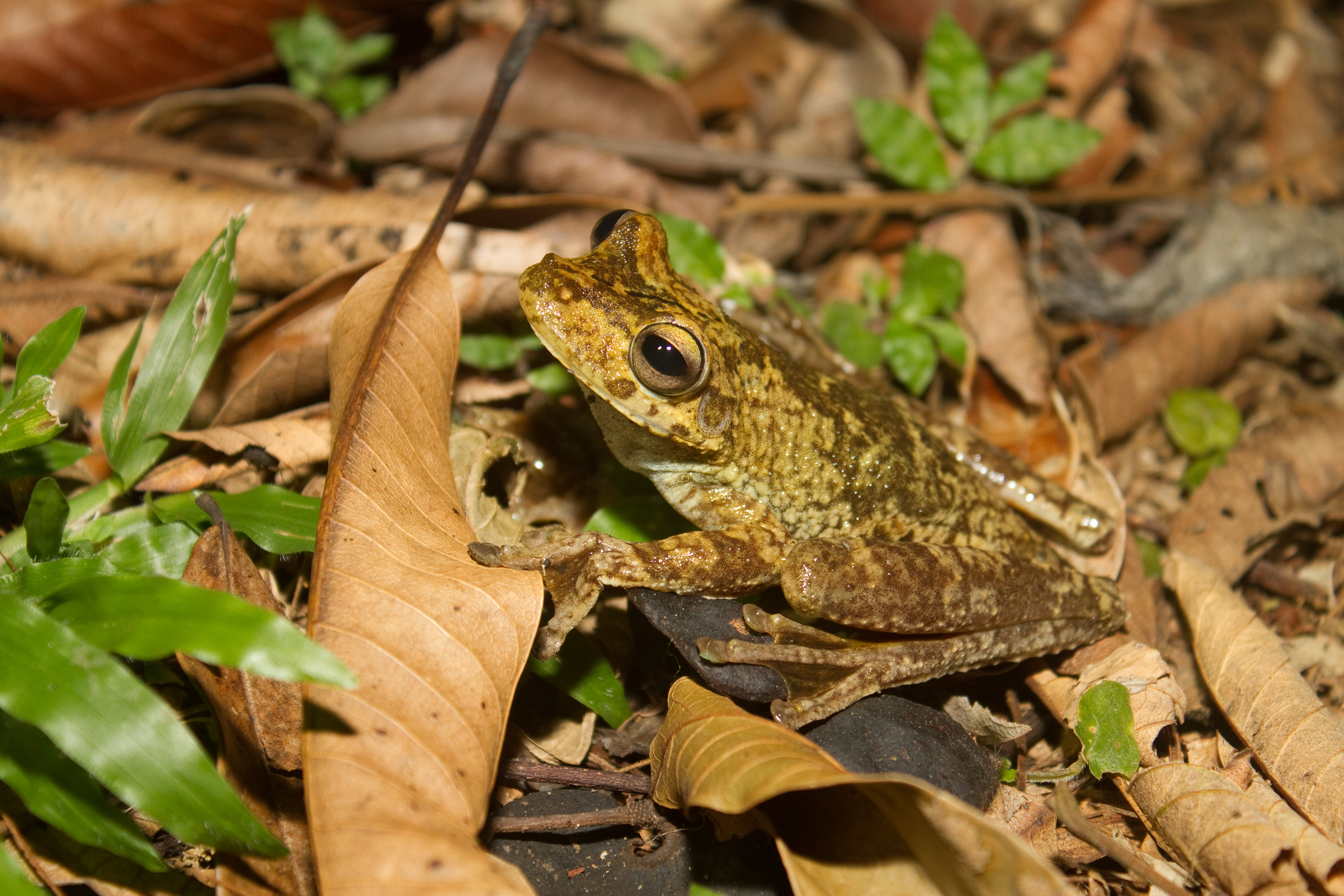

Conservation status
- Least Concern (IUCN 3.1)

Scientific classification
- Kingdom: Animalia
- Phylum: Chordata
- Class: Amphibia
- Order: Anura
- Family: Hylidae
- Genus: Hypsiboas
- Species: H. rosenbergi

Binomial name
- Hypsiboas rosenbergi (Boulenger, 1898)

Synonyms
- Hyla rosenbergi Boulenger, 1898; "Boana rosenbergi" Boulenger, 1898; Hypsiboas rosenbergi (Boulenger, 1898)

= Rosenberg's tree frog =

Species of amphibian

Rosenberg's treefrog (Hypsiboas rosenbergi), also known as Rosenberg's gladiator frog or Rosenberg's gladiator treefrog, is a species of frog in the family of tree frogs (Hylidae) and genus of gladiator frogs (Boana) found in Costa Rica, Panama, Colombia, Trinidad and Tobago and north-western Ecuador. Its scientific name is a testimony to Mr. W. F. H. Rosenberg who collected the type series, and its common name refers to the aggressiveness of males of the species.

== Description ==
The size of H. rosenbergi varies based on the population that they belong to, with individuals from the Costa Rican population being smaller in size than those from the Panamanian population. In the Panamanian population, males of H. rosenbergi measure on average 83 mm (3.3 in) in snout–vent length and females 86 mm (3.4 in). Females also tend to be heavier than males.

It has partly webbed fingers and entirely webbed toes and large disks on both fingers and toes. Its skin is granulated with small warts, and yellowish, greyish, or reddish in colour, with brown or blackish marbling or spots. It also has dark worm-like markings across the dorsal surfaces of the body and limbs, with gray-white undersurfaces and a pigmented area that covers near the throat. Males tend to have more pigmented throats than females, a feature which is likely a result of hormonal control due to more pigmented individuals calling more often. Females, on the other hand, tend to contain more yellow dorsal colors than males. In addition, the female's body wall in front of its groin is nearly transparent, a feature that allows its black eggs to be easily seen. H. rosenbergi has a pale yellow lower jaw with similar black worm-like markings as seen on the dorsal surface, and its eyes have a bronze/golden iris with black around it. However, most of their color fades to light gray or tan during the day, and most of the patterns visible also disappear.

H. rosenbergi males have prepollical spines on their hands that consist of pointed spines with scythe-shaped features. The prepollical spines are used in combat and contribute to its alternative name "Rosenberg's gladiator frog". Females also possess these spines, though they are very small, and only males have control over its position and the ability to retract its fleshy sheath to reveal the scythe-shaped parts for combat.

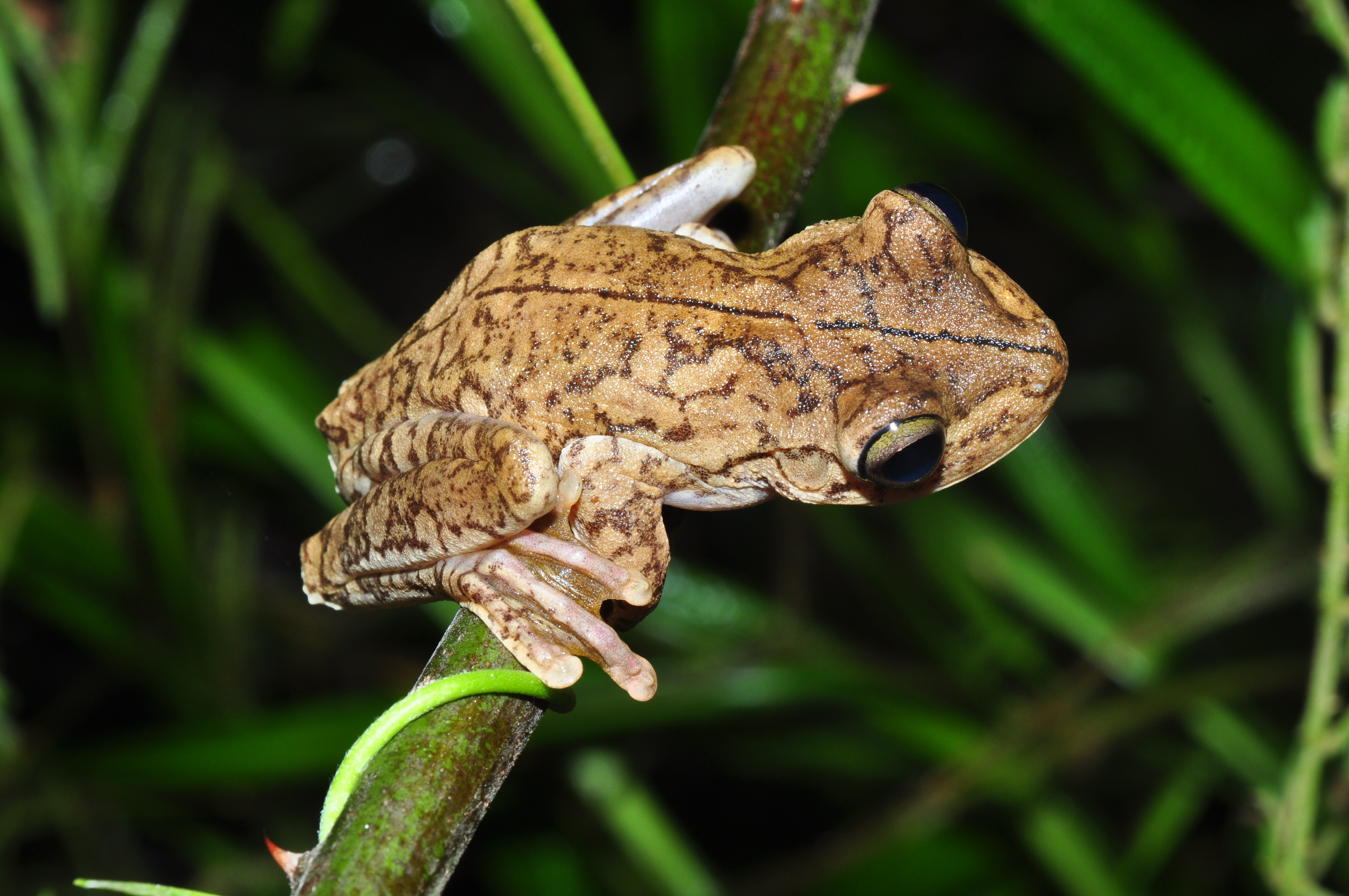
Rosenberg's tree frog (H. rosenbergi)

== Habitat and distribution ==
H. rosenbergi inhabits primary and secondary forest, as well as in heavily altered areas such as small strips of trees in pastureland. The species has been recorded from Panama to Costa Rica. However, it is unknown if the species is discontinuous throughout this distribution or if the three disjunct ranges that have been found in south-central Panama or extended over the Panamanian canal zone over Colombia to Ecuador represent failure to make collections of the species. At its largest, the distribution of H. rosenbergi may stretch from central Panama to western Ecuador. It is sympatric with H. boans and sometimes H. pugnax, and co-occur with both of these species in the headwaters of Rio Sinu and in Parque Nacional Natural de Katios in the northern Choco region of Colombia.

== Conservation ==
It is considered an adaptable species that is not facing any significant threats. H. rosenbergi has been found in Piedras Blancas National Park and Corcovado National Park in Costa Rica, providing it with protected habitat to alleviate concerns of habitat loss.

== Diet ==
Individuals of H. rosenbergi eat arthropods that are found close to the ground. Known and suspected insect prey reach their peak abundance during the wet season.

Reproductively mature frogs do not grow during the breeding season, this is due to increased energy expenditure rather than food shortage. Females allocate energy towards growing eggs, and males allocate energy towards advertising for mates, building nests, and defending territory – all of which simultaneously detracts from hunting time. During the breeding season, females tend to hunt for food around the forest canopy, while males find food at lower elevations.

== Reproduction and life-cycle ==
Females of H. rosenbergi lay clutches approximately once every 25 days, with an average clutch size of around two thousand eggs. These eggs have a dark animal pole and yellow-white vegetal pole surrounded by two clear capsules, and are laid singly onto the surface of the water where they spread to form a monolayer. The offspring form tail buds around 40 hours after fertilization, which then grow rapidly until 150 hours after fertilization, after which the tail bud lengthened more slowly. In addition, the offspring start hatching from the eggs around 40 hours after fertilization, followed by swimming motions around 85 hours after fertilization, and active swimming by 140 hours after fertilization. The tadpoles had large filamentous gills. Tadpoles of H. rosenbergi undergo metamorphosis at a size of 21mm SVL, approximately 40 days after fertilization, resulting in extremely large fat bodies and visibly undifferentiated gonads. These froglets are covered with many small dark spots and have much less webbing in the fingers and toes as compared to adult frogs. After metamorphosis, the froglets leave the water. Individuals of this species can reach sexual maturity in one year.

Reproduction in H. rosenbergi is influenced by both social and environmental factors. Females of the species have been found to be influenced by the social cue of the current chorus size in moderating their reproductive activity, while males have been found to be influenced both by same day precipitation (with heavy rainfall decreasing activity) and previous day chorus size.

== Mating ==
The breeding season of H. rosenbergi runs from March through May. The mating system for H. rosenbergi revolves around a nest occupied by the male. Once nests are constructed, males call from within the nest during the nighttime, calling only a few nights over a one-week period. In particular, males produce an advertisement call, described as a "tonk-tonk-tonk" sound of three notes, to attract gravid females. This advertisement call has socially mediated plasticity, as the presence and distance of competing males influences the calling rate. As competition in the form of the number of nearby males or attractiveness of nearby males increases, male individuals of this species increase their calling rate. In addition, nearest neighbor males have similar call rates, indicating that they adjust their call rates to each other. The advertisement call is usually called in small groups.

During pair formation, the female responds to the male's advertisement call by approaching and entering the male's nest opposite the male's back, at which time the male stops calling or switches to a courtship call longer in duration than the advertisement call. The female then swims around the nest and spends time inspecting it. In the Panamanian population, some females were observed renovating the nest, but this was not found in the Costa Rican population. At the end of the inspection period, if the female decides to mate with the male, the female will massage the male with her chest through a swimming motion and patting her hands, after which the male will mount the female to initiate amplexus. The male then clasps both sides of the female's neck, as the female is completely submerged except for the cloacal opening. Amplexus lasts for approximately 10 minutes, after which the eggs spread across the surface of the water to form a monolayer. Forced amplexus is rare. Occasionally, another male will attack an amplexed pair to separate them, and the attacking male occasionally then mates with the female.

In general, mating success in this species is highly skewed, as a minority of calling males are able to mate successfully with a female. The best predictor of male mating success is chorus tenure, or the number of nights that a male has participated in the calling chorus.

== Parental care ==
Parental care in this species takes the form of clutch guarding and nest building for oviposition.

These nests are water-filled depressions in the ground, and their structure varies based on the environment in which they are built. In Panama's canal zone, where the species breeds along a river, all males build their own nests. However, in the Costa Rican population in a small swamp of cattle pasture, only a fraction of males built nests, as males would occupy small puddles or cattle footprints as nests. They would only build nests by pushing vegetation down and away when the other depressions were not available. Thus, this species displays facultative nest construction, as nest construction is a very time and energy consuming activity (it takes males one night to build a nest, during which the male cannot call for mating), so individuals of this species would take advantage of local conditions that decrease nest construction time and sometimes will reuse existing nests. Males of this species do not generally share nests, but abandoned nests will be reused.

For clutch guarding, males will sit on a perch near or immediately above a freshly laid egg monolayer, remaining silent except for infrequent territorial calls. The males likely guard clutches against intruding males who could disrupt the surface tension of the egg monolayers, causing the clutches to sink and the eggs to die. Males clutch guard for one or two nights, but never longer, which is reasonable given the cost of not advertising. In addition, males will leave their clutch but return to guarding position when territorial or advertisement signals are broadcast near the clutch, indicating the presence of rival males. Interestingly, clutch guarding behavior is solely observed in the Panamanian population of H. rosenbergi, not the Costa Rican population.

== Social behavior ==
Males of this species are split into intruder and resident categories, depending on if the male occupied a nest from which to call from, but intruder males rarely displace residents from their nests. The intruders would move frequently without giving advertisement calls, but would produce territorial and encounter calls.

While aggression from males is implicit in the English name of this species, male-male aggression and combat has only been observed in the Panamanian population of the species, not the Costa Rican one, likely due to the abundance of nest sites and low density of reproductively active males in the Costa Rican population.

When observed, aggression in H. rosenbergi took three different forms: undirected, nonviolent, or violent. Undirected aggression includes territorial calls and encounter vocalizations that were not directed to a particular opponent. Nonviolent aggression occurs when males sense each other but no physical contact happens, as males charge and chase each other. Violent aggression occurs when males make physical contact with each other, either through wrestling or knocking opponents away, in or near a nest. Violent aggression also involved growling and hissing and the use of unsheathed prepollical spines, and can result in serious wounds or death. In addition, violent aggression is the most costly form of aggression due to the increased chance of being preyed upon as noise and exposure from the fight brings about attention from predators. It also is a large energetic cost for males who fight and typically forces them to leave the breeding area or it results in them being unable to call to find a mate.

== Predators ==
Predators of H. rosenbergi include snakes (such as Leptodeira annulata), other frogs (such as Leptodactylus pentadactylus) and possibly mammals (such as Chironectes minimus, Philander opossum and Metachirus nudicaudatus) and crocodilians (such as spectacled caiman). Predation often occurs at night.
