= Worm snake =

Worm snake is the common name sometimes given to several species of snakes:

- Carphophis
- Typhlina, a taxonomic synonym, including:
  - Ramphotyphlops
  - Leptotyphlops
- Typhlops, a genus of blind snakes in the family Typhlopidae
