= Pofadder =

Pofadder is the Afrikaans name for puff adder (snake).

Pofadder may also refer to:

- Pofadder, Northern Cape, a small town in South Africa
- Pofadder (food), a traditional South African food made from the same ingredients as Skilpadjies but is a bigger sausage type.
