= Western hog-nosed viper =

Western hog-nosed viper may refer to:

- Heterodon nasicus, a.k.a. the western hog-nosed snake, a harmless colubrid species found in the United States
- Porthidium ophryomegas, a.k.a. the slender hognosed pitviper, a venomous pitviper species found in Central America
