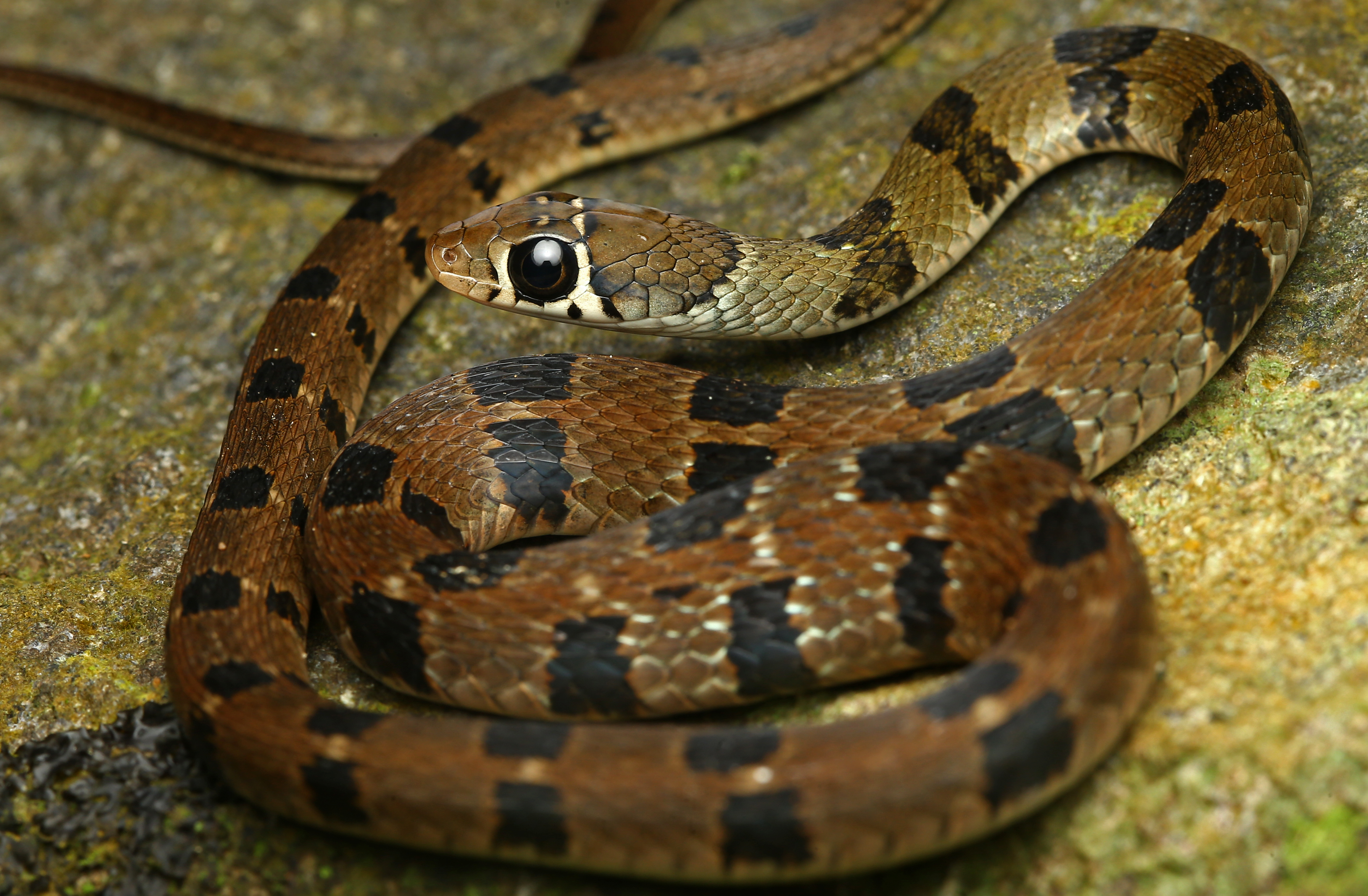

Conservation status
- Least Concern (IUCN 3.1)

Scientific classification
- Kingdom: Animalia
- Phylum: Chordata
- Class: Reptilia
- Order: Squamata
- Suborder: Serpentes
- Family: Colubridae
- Genus: Amphiesma
- Species: A. monticola

Binomial name
- Amphiesma monticola (Jerdon, 1853)

Synonyms
- Tropidonotus monticolus Jerdon, 1853; Tropidonotus monticola Boulenger, 1890; Rhabdophis monticola Wall, 1923; Natrix monticola M.A. Smith, 1943; Amphiesma monticola Das, 1996; Hebius monticola Guo et al., 2014

= Amphiesma monticola =

Species of snake

Amphiesma monticola, also known as the Wynad keelback, is a harmless colubrid snake species endemic to the Western Ghats of India, where it has been recorded in the Kodagu and Wayanad regions.

== Description ==
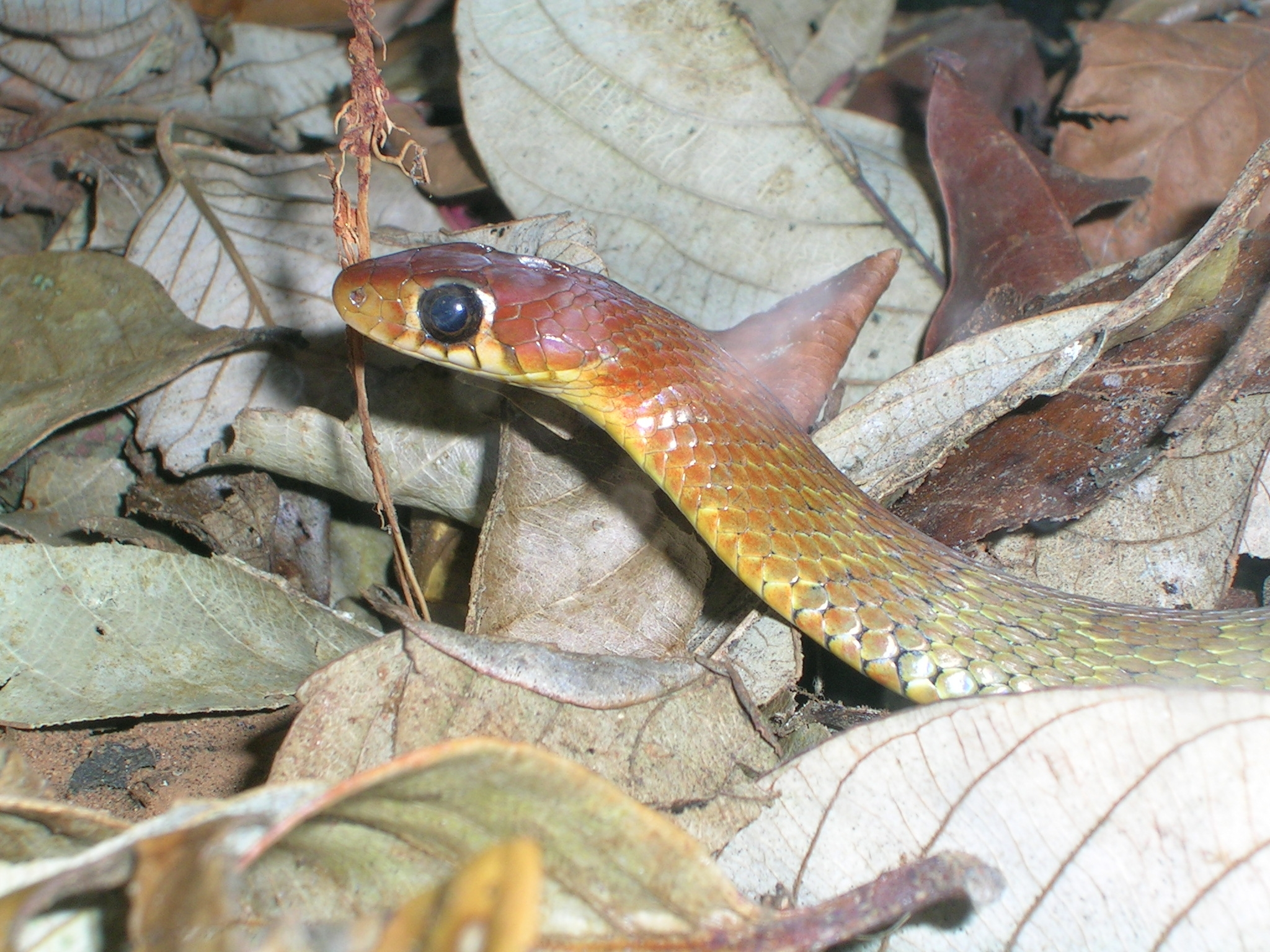

Adults are small and slender and found in leaf litter in forest habitats. The head is reddish. The body is brownish with a greenish gloss, while some individuals are bright green.

This species has 19 keeled dorsal scale rows at midbody, 133–144 ventrals. The anal scale is divided, and it has 78–92 subcaudals, which are also divided. There are 8 supralabials with the 3rd, 4th and 5th touching the eye. There is one preocular scale.

Description from G. A. Boulenger, The Fauna of British India, Including Ceylon and Burma:

Eye large, its diameter more than its distance from the nostril; rostral just visible from above; suture between the internasals shorter than that between the prefrontals; frontal considerably longer than its distance from the end of the snout, as long as the parietals; loreal as long as deep, or deeper than long; one preocular; three postoculars; temporals 2 + 2; upper labials 8, third, fourth, and fifth entering the eye; 5 lower labials in contact with the anterior chin shields, which are a little shorter than the posterior chin shields.

Scales in 19 rows, strongly keeled, except for those in the outer row which are smooth or feebly keeled. Ventrals 134–142; anal divided; subcaudals 80–92. Green above, with black crossbands divided on each side by a pale spot; a white line across the head behind the eyes, and a white dot on each side of the frontal; preoculars, postoculars, and labials 3 to 6, all white; lower parts white.

Total length 45 cm (18 inches), tail 14 cm (5½ inches).
