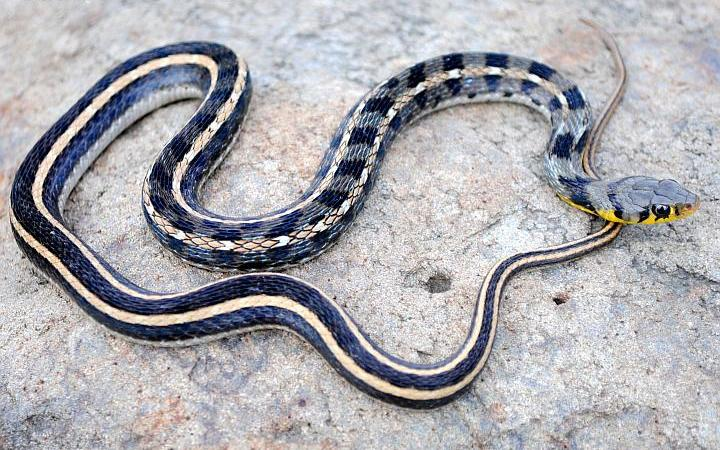
- Buff striped keelback (Amphiesma stolatum)

Scientific classification
- Kingdom: Animalia
- Phylum: Chordata
- Class: Reptilia
- Order: Squamata
- Suborder: Serpentes
- Family: Colubridae
- Subfamily: Natricinae
- Genus: Amphiesma; A.M.C. Duméril, Bibron & A.H.A. Duméril, 1854

Species
- Two recognized species, see article.

= Amphiesma =

Genus of snakes

Amphiesma is a genus of snakes in the subfamily Natricinae of the family Colubridae. Species in the genus Amphiesma are found across Asia.

== Species ==
- Amphiesma stolatum (Linnaeus, 1758) – buff striped keelback
- Amphiesma monticola (Jerdon, 1853) – Wynad keelback
