= Sand viper =

Sand viper may refer to:

- Vipera ammodytes, a.k.a. the nose-horned viper, a venomous species found in Europe through to the Balkans and parts of the Middle East.
- Cerastes vipera, a.k.a. the Avicenna viper, a venomous species found in the deserts of North Africa and the Sinai Peninsula.
- Heterodon, a.k.a. hog-nosed snakes, a genus of harmless colubrid species found in North America.
