= Common keelback =

Common keelback may refer to several species of colubrid snakes of the subfamily Natricinae:

- Tropidonophis mairii — common keelback, Mair's keelback (Australia, New Guinea)
- Fowlea flavipunctatus — yellow-spotted keelback (Southeast Asia)
- Rhabdophis subminiatus — red-necked keelback (South and Southeast Asia)
