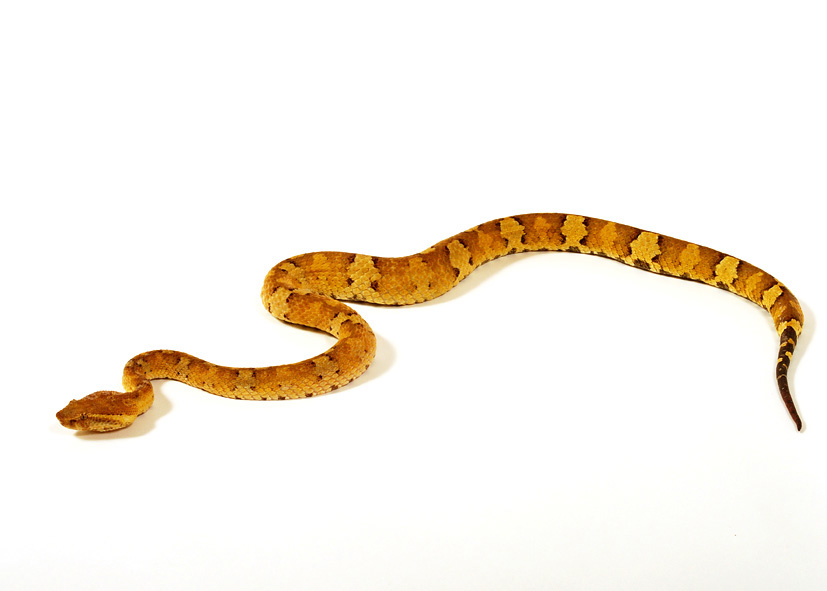

Scientific classification
- Kingdom: Animalia
- Phylum: Chordata
- Class: Reptilia
- Order: Squamata
- Suborder: Serpentes
- Family: Viperidae
- Genus: Craspedocephalus
- Species: C. puniceus

Binomial name
- Craspedocephalus puniceus (Kuhl, 1824)

Synonyms
- [Craspedocephalus] puniceus Kuhl, 1824; Trigonocephalus puniceus – Kuhl, 1824; [Cophias] punicea – F. Boie, 1827; Atropos puniceus – Wagler, 1830; Atropos acontia Gray, 1842; Trigonocephalus puniceus – Schlegel, 1824; Trimeresurus puniceus – Boettger, 1892; Lachesis puniceus – Boulenger, 1896; Trimeresurus wiroti Trutnau, 1981; Trimeresurus puniceus puniceus – Cox, 1991; Trimeresurus puniceus wiroti – Cox, 1991; T[rimeresurus]. puniceus – Nutphand, Cox, Trutnau & H.M. Smith, 1991; Trimeresurus (Craspedocephalus) puniceus – David et al., 2011

= Craspedocephalus puniceus =

Species of snake

Craspedocephalus puniceus is a venomous pit viper species endemic to Southeast Asia. Common names include: flat-nosed pitviper, flat-nosed pit viper, and ashy pit viper. No subspecies are recognized as being valid.

== Description ==
Adults of Craspedocephalus puniceus may attain a total length of 64 cm (25 in), which includes a prehensile tail 9 cm (3.5 in) long.

Dorsally, C. puniceus is gray, brown, or red, with dark blotches or crossbars, which may merge to form an undulating stripe. On each side of the head, behind the eye, is a light streak. Ventrally, it is powdered with dark brown, and usually has lateral series of yellowish spots. The body length depends on the gender. The adult male body ranges from 60–70 cm (24–28 in) and the adult female body 100–130 cm (39–51 in) in length.

Scalation includes 21–23 rows of dorsal scales at midbody, 158–173 ventral scales, 41–56 subcaudal scales, and 10–13 supralabial scales. The dorsal scales are weekly keeled, and the anal plate is entire.

== Venom ==
Craspedocephalus puniceus can be found on Java and southern Sumatra. Envenomation is still a relatively major issue in certain parts of the world. One major area affected by envenomation is Asia. Through the study of the venom excreted by C. puniceus, we can potentially observe and find the effects of the venom based on the concentration and amount received. Research has shown that the higher the concentration of the venom, the greater the effect on the red blood cells.

== Geographic range ==
Crasspedocephalus puniceus is found in southern Thailand, West and East Malaysia (Sabah and Sarawak), and Indonesia (Borneo, Sumatra, the Mentawai Islands of Siberut and North Pagai, Simalur, and Java). The type locality given is "Java".
