= Black-headed snake =

There is a genus of snake named black-headed snake:

- Tantilla

There are two species of snake named black-headed snake:

- Tantilla melanocephala
- Telescopus nigriceps
