= Typhlina =

Typhlina is a taxonomic synonym that may refer to:

- Ramphotyphlops, also known as long tailed blindsnakes, a genus of harmless snakes found in southern and southeast Asia and Australia, with one species inhabiting the Americas, as well as many islands in the southern Pacific Ocean.
- Leptotyphlops, also known as slender blind snakes, a genus of harmless snakes found throughout North and South America, Africa and southwestern Asia.
