= Black snake =

Black snake may refer to:

== Snakes ==
- Agkistrodon piscivorus, a.k.a. the cottonmouth, a pitviper species found in North America
- Coluber constrictor, a colubrid species found in North America
- Crotalus oreganus, a.k.a. the Northern Pacific rattlesnake, a rattlesnake species found in North America
- Pantherophis alleghaniensis, Pantherophis obsoletus, and Pantherophis spiloides, a.k.a. the black (or gray) rat snake or the pilot black snake, three colubrid snake species found in North America
- Pseudechis, a genus of elapids snakes found in Australia

== Other ==
- A type of whip
- Black snake (firework), a type of firework
- Governor Blacksnake (1760–1859), a Seneca chief also known as Chainbreaker
- Black Snake (Shawnee), a leader in the defeat of Colonel William Crawford's army during the Crawford expedition of 1782
- Black Snake (film), made in 1973 and directed by Russ Meyer
- Black Snake, Kentucky

== See also ==
- Kala Nag (lit. 'black snake'), a mountain in India
- Kalanag (magician), German magician who adopted an Indian moniker
- Kaala Naag, villain portrayed by Sadashiv Amrapurkar in the 1989 Indian film Elaan-E-Jung
