= Green mamba =

Green mamba may refer to:

- Eastern green mamba (Dendroaspis angusticeps), an arboreal snake found in the east of southern Africa and much of East Africa
- Western green mamba (Dendroaspis viridis), an arboreal snake found in the southern part of West Africa
- Jameson's mamba (Dendroaspis jamesoni), an arboreal snake found mainly in Western and Central Africa
- Green Mamba FC, a football club from Eswatini based in Simunye
- Green Mamba (comics), a Marvel Comics character
