= False coral snake =

False coral snake may refer to:

- Anilius, a genus of snakes, and its single species Anilius scytale
- Erythrolamprus, a genus of snakes in the family Colubridae
- Oxyrhopus, a genus of snakes in the family Colubridae
- Pliocercus, a genus of snakes in the family Colubridae
  - Erythrolamprus pseudocorallus, a species of snake in the family Colubridae
