= Nose-horned viper =

Nose-horned viper may refer to:

- Vipera ammodytes, a.k.a. the sand viper, a venomous species found in southern Europe, the Balkans and the Middle East
- Bitis nasicornis, a.k.a. the rhinoceros viper, a venomous species found in the forests of West and Central Africa
