= Mountain adder =

Mountain adder may refer to:

- Bitis atropos, a.k.a. the berg adder, a venomous viper species found only in three mountainous regions in southern Africa
- Daboia mauritanica, a.k.a. the Moorish viper, a venomous species found in northwestern Africa
