= Fer-de-Lance =

Fer-de-Lance may refer to:

== Snakes ==
- Bothrops, a genus of pit vipers sometimes called fer-de-lance
  - B. lanceolatus, the Martinique lancehead snake
  - B. caribbaeus, the Saint Lucia lancehead
  - B. atrox, the common lancehead, native to tropical South America east of the Andes and to Trinidad
  - B. asper, the terciopelo or Central American lancehead, native to Central and northwestern South America
  - B. insularis, the golden lancehead, a Brazilian species

== Other uses ==
- Fer-de-Lance (novel), a 1934 Nero Wolfe mystery
- Fer-de-Lance (comics), Teresa Vasquez, a Marvel comics supervillain
- Fer-de-Lance, a 1974 TV adventure film starring David Janssen
