= Pipe snake =

Pipe snake may refer to:

Snakes:

- Aniliidae, a.k.a. the false coral snakes, a family of harmless snakes found in South America.
- Cylindrophiidae, a.k.a. Asian pipe snakes, a family of harmless snakes found in Asia.
- Uropeltidae, a.k.a. shield-tailed snakes, a family of harmless snakes found in southern India and Sri Lanka.

Other:

- Plumber's snake, a tool used to clear clogged drains
