= Sand adder =

Sand adder may refer to any of the following snakes:

- Vipera ammodytes, a.k.a. the nose-horned viper, a venomous viper species found in southern Europe through to the Balkans and parts of the Middle East
- Heterodon platirhinos, a.k.a. the eastern hog-nosed snake, a harmless colubrid species found in North America
