= Ground snake =

Ground snake can refer to several distinct genera of snakes:

- Genus Arcanumophis, a monotypic genus of snake, with the species Arcanumophis problematicus as its sole representative
- Genus Atractus, South American ground snakes.
- Genus Lygophis
- Genus Psomophis
- Genus Sonora, North American ground snakes, especially Sonora episcopa
- Genus Stegonotus

It can also refer to a species of snake:

- Magliophis exiguus
