= Harlequin snake =

Harlequin snake may refer to:

- Agkistrodon contortrix mokasen, the northern copperhead, a venomous viper found in the eastern United States
- Micrurus fulvius, the eastern coral snake, a venomous elapid found in the eastern United States
- Micrurus tener, the Texas coral snake, a venomous elapid found in the southern United States and northern/central Mexico
