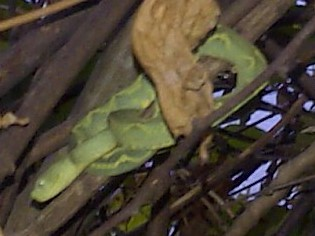

Conservation status
- Least Concern (IUCN 3.1)

Scientific classification
- Kingdom: Animalia
- Phylum: Chordata
- Class: Reptilia
- Order: Squamata
- Suborder: Serpentes
- Family: Viperidae
- Genus: Atheris
- Species: A. rungweensis

Binomial name
- Atheris rungweensis Bogert, 1940

Synonyms
- Atheris nitschei rungweensis Bogert, 1940

= Atheris rungweensis =

Species of venomous snake

Atheris rungweensis, commonly known as the Rungwe tree viper, Mt Rungwe bush viper, and Rungwe leaf viper, is a species of venomous snake in the subfamily Viperinae of the family Viperidae. The species is native to East Africa.

== Taxonomy and etymology ==
The specific name rungweensis is derived from the species' type locality in the Rungwe Mountains. A. rungweensis was formerly considered as a subspecies of Atheris nitschei.

== Description ==
A. rungweensis grows to a maximum total length (tail included) of 65 cm (26 in). At midbody, it has 22–33 dorsal scale rows. The ventral scales number 150–165, and the subcaudals 46–58.

The color pattern is variable, with a ground color that ranges from bright green to green to black. Usually, this is overlaid with a pair of yellow dorsolateral zigzag lines. A row of yellow spots on the sides of the ventral scales may also be present. Specimens from the Sumbawanga region usually have a green, yellow, and black color pattern. Neonates are a dark brown or gray, but with a bright yellow tail tip.

== Distribution and habitat ==
A. rungweensis is known from scattered locations from south-western Tanzania to north-eastern Zambia and south to the Nyika Plateau in northern Malawi.

A. rungweensis is usually found in low bushes along streams and at the edges of mountain forests at altitudes of 800–2,000 m (2,600–6,600 ft). Occasionally, it is encountered in moist savanna, woodland, and hill forest habitats.

== Behavior ==
A. rungweensis is fully arboreal.

== Reproduction ==
A. rungweensis is ovoviviparous.
