= Copperhead =

Copperhead may refer to:

== Snakes ==
- Agkistrodon contortrix, or eastern copperhead, found in parts of North America
- Agkistrodon laticinctus, or broad-banded copperhead, found in the southern United States
- Austrelaps, or Australian copperhead, found in southern Australia and Tasmania
- Coelognathus radiatus, or copperhead rat snake, found in southern Asia
- Deinagkistrodon acutus, or Chinese copperhead, found in southeast Asia

== Arts, entertainment and media ==
=== Fictional entities ===
- Copperhead (DC Comics), the name of several supervillains
- Copperhead (G.I. Joe), a fictional character
- Copperhead (Marvel Comics), the name of three different supervillains
- Copperhead, codename of Vernita Green in the movie Kill Bill
- The Copperhead, masked hero of the 1940 film serial Mysterious Doctor Satan

=== Film ===
- Copperhead (2008 film), an American horror film
- Copperhead (2013 film), an American historical war drama film
- The Copperhead, a 1920 silent historical drama film

=== Other uses in arts, entertainment and media ===
- Copperhead (1970s band), a band featuring John Cipollina
- Copperhead (Image Comics), a Space Western comic book series
- Copperhead, the second volume in the American Civil War series The Starbuck Chronicles by Bernard Cornwell

== Military ==
- M712 Copperhead, a 155 mm caliber cannon-launched guided projectile
- Operation Copperhead, a British deception operation in World War 2
- Copperhead (UUV), a family of reusable unmanned underwater vehicles

== Other uses ==
- Copperhead (politics), Northern Peace Democrats who opposed the American Civil War
- CopperheadOS, a mobile operating system for smartphones
- Copperhead (climbing), a small metal nut used in rock climbing
- Dodge Copperhead, a concept car
- Atlanta Copperheads, a rugby league team in the United States
- Copperhead, a community in The Archipelago, Ontario, Canada

== See also ==
- Agkistrodon piscivorus, or cottonmouth, a species of venomous snake
- Demon Copperhead, a 2022 novel by Barbara Kingsolver
