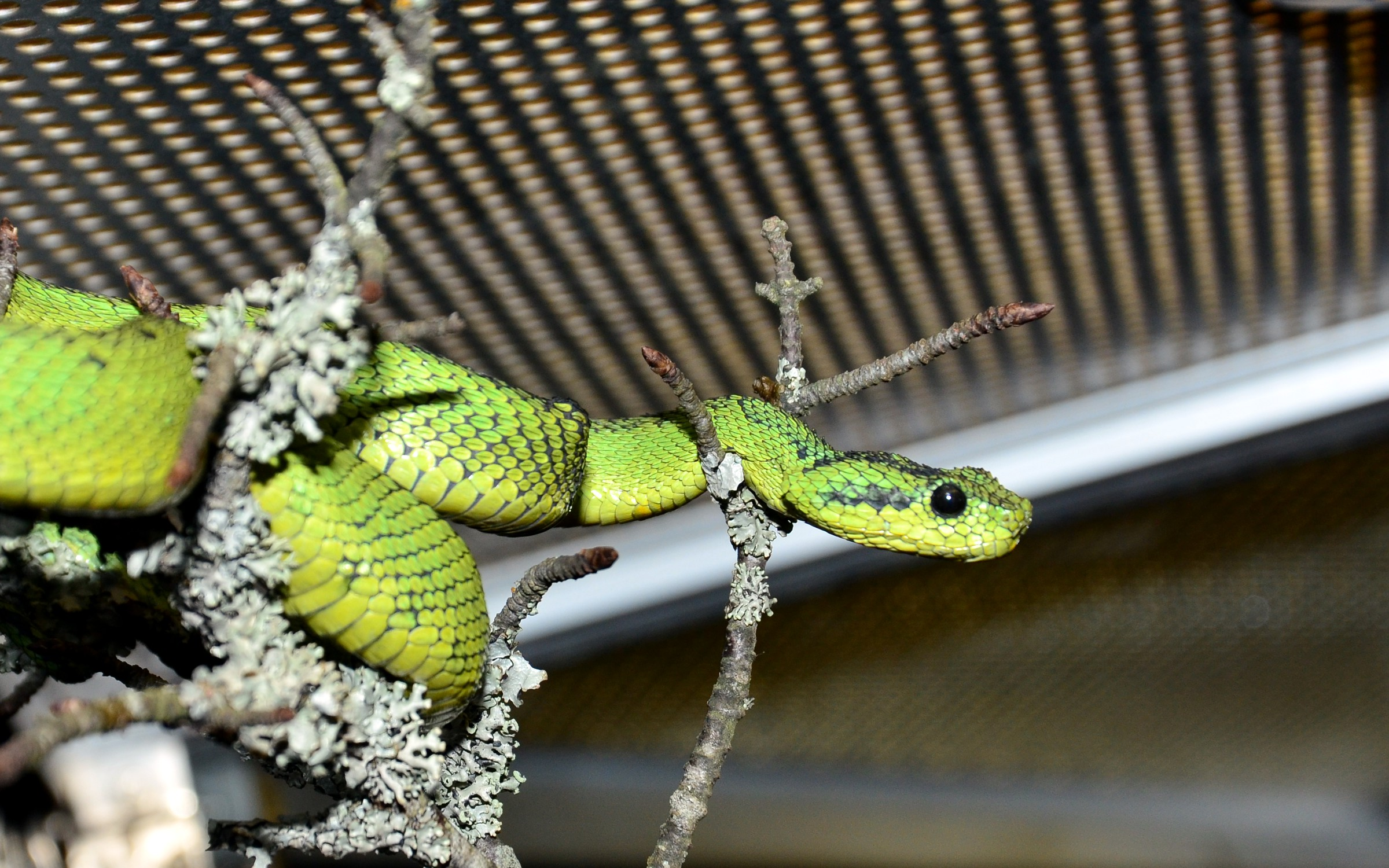

Scientific classification
- Kingdom: Animalia
- Phylum: Chordata
- Class: Reptilia
- Order: Squamata
- Suborder: Serpentes
- Family: Viperidae
- Genus: Atheris
- Species: A. nitschei

Binomial name
- Atheris nitschei Tornier, 1902

Synonyms
- Atheris nitschei Tornier, 1902; Atheris woosnami Boulenger, 1906; Atheris nitschei — Boulenger, 1915; Atheris nitschei nitschei — Bogert, 1940; [Atheris] nitschei — Broadley, 1996

= Atheris nitschei =

Species of snake

Common names: Great Lakes bush viper, Nitsche's bush viper, more.

Atheris nitschei is a species of venomous snake, a viper in the subfamily Viperinae of the family Viperidae. The species is native to Africa. There are no subspecies that are recognized as being valid.

== Taxonomy ==
The former subspecies Atheris nitschei rungweensis from southwestern Tanzania, northeastern Zambia and northern Malawi was elevated to species rank as Atheris rungweensis.

== Etymology ==
The specific name, nitschei, is in honor of German zoologist Hinrich Nitsche (1845–1902).

The 1906 junior synonym, A. woosnami, was in honor of Kenyan game ranger Richard Bowen Woosnam (1880–1915), who later fought in World War I and was killed in action at Gallipoli.

== Description ==
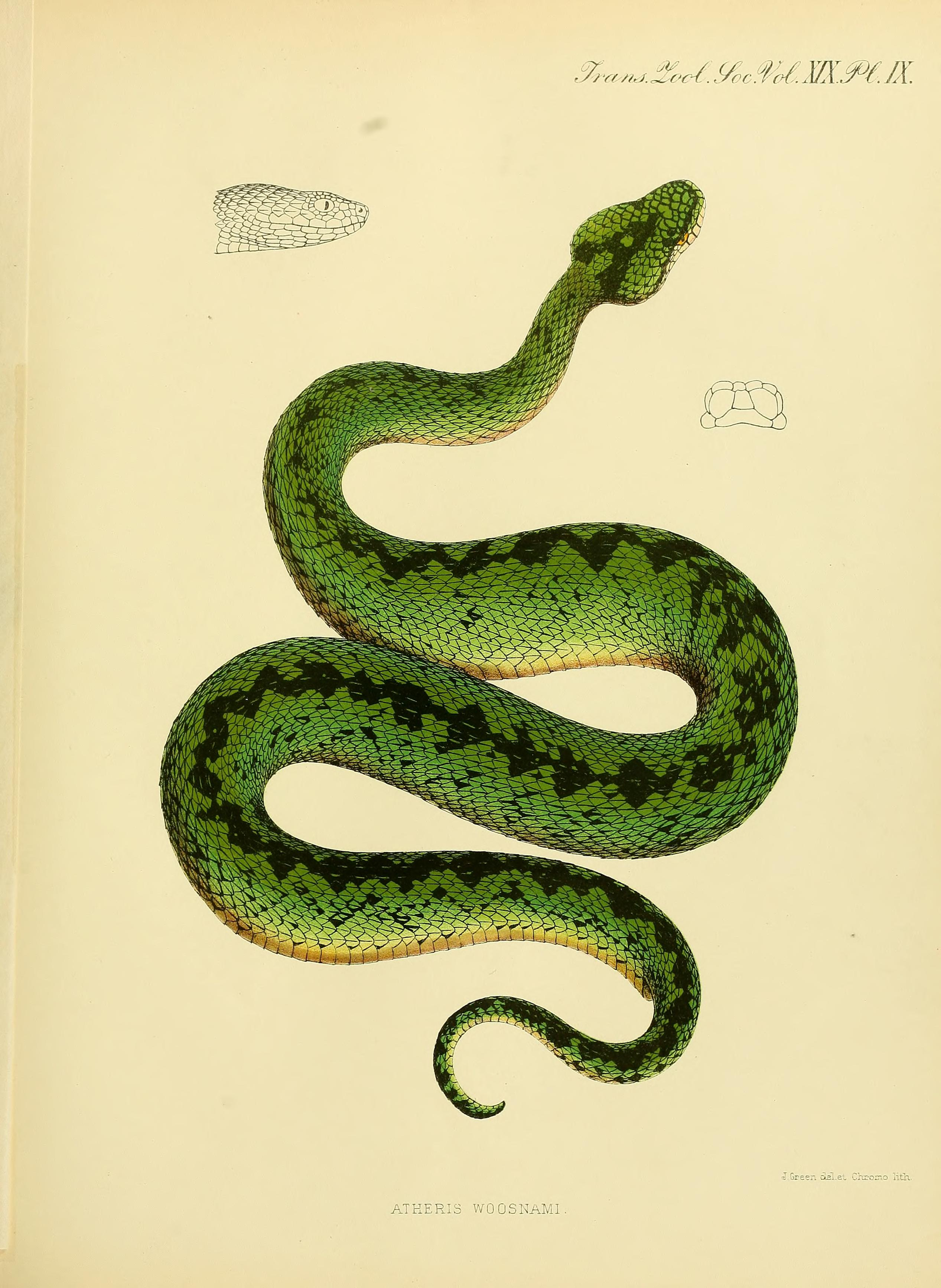
Illustration

Atheris nitschei is a relatively large and stout bush viper, growing to an average total length (tail included) of 60 cm (24 in) and a maximum total length of at least 80 cm (31 in). The males are smaller than the females.

== Common names ==
Common names for Atheris nitschei include Great Lakes bush viper, Nitsche's bush viper, black and green bush viper, Nitsche's tree viper. sedge viper, green viper, bush viper.

== Geographic distribution ==
Atheris nitschei is found in forests of the Central African Albertine Rift, in southern and eastern DR Congo, Uganda, western Tanzania, Rwanda, Burundi, and Zambia.

The type locality is listed as "Mpororosumpf, Deutsch-Ost-Afrika" [Mpororo swamp, Tanzania-Rwanda border].

== Habitat ==
Preferred natural habitats of Atheris nitschei are wetland and meadow areas, and elephant grass marshes, along small streams, sometimes in scrub and bush in valleys at higher elevations, and in mountain forests up to the bamboo zone at 1,600–2,800 m (5,200–9,200 ft) altitude. It is common in papyrus reed around small lakes.

== Venom ==
Atheris nitschei has highly toxic venom like other species in the genus Atheris. Not much is known about its venom but envenomation has caused severe bleeding and hemorrhaging.

== Reproduction ==
Atheris nitschei is viviparous.
