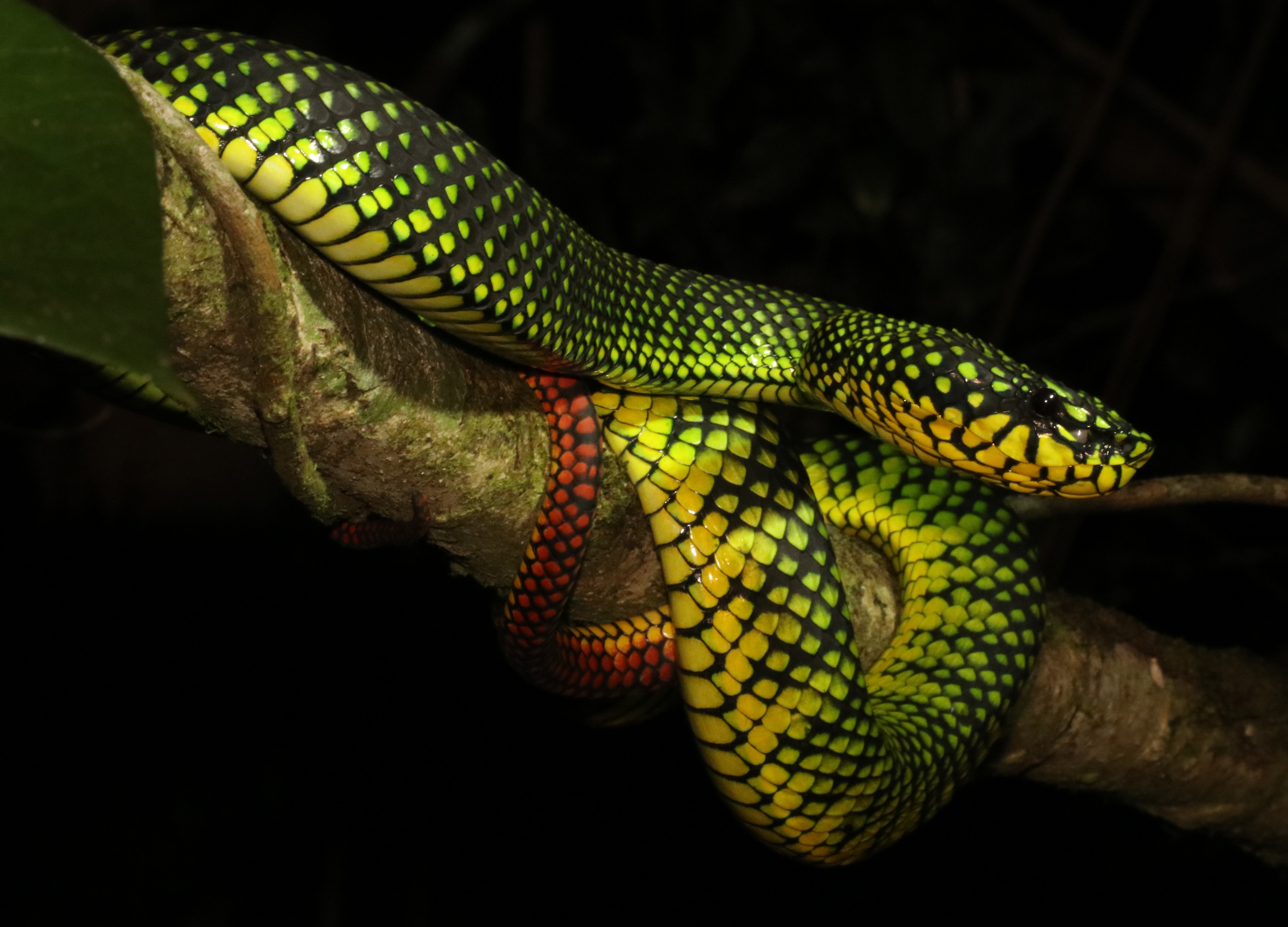
- Trimeresurus malcolmi from Mount Kinabalu, Sabah, Malaysia

Conservation status
- Near Threatened (IUCN 3.1)

Scientific classification
- Kingdom: Animalia
- Phylum: Chordata
- Class: Reptilia
- Order: Squamata
- Suborder: Serpentes
- Family: Viperidae
- Genus: Trimeresurus
- Species: T. malcolmi

Binomial name
- Trimeresurus malcolmi Loveridge, 1938

Synonyms
- Trimeresurus sumatranus malcolmi Loveridge, 1938; Trimeresurus sumatranus malcolmi — Golay et al., 1993; Parias malcolmi — Malhotra & Thorpe, 2004; Trimeresurus (Parias) malcolmi — David et al., 2011

= Trimeresurus malcolmi =

Species of snake

Trimeresurus malcolmi is a species of pit viper. The species is native to East Malaysia. Common names include: Malcolm's pitviper, Malcolm's tree viper, and Mt. Kinabalu pit viper.

== Etymology ==
The specific name, malcolmi, is in honor of British herpetologist Malcolm Arthur Smith.

== Description ==
The scalation of Trimeresurus malcolmi includes 19 rows of dorsal scales at midbody, 163-174 ventral scales, 64-81/61-64 subcaudal scales in males/females, and 8-9 supralabial scales. It can also wiggle its tail back and forth when threatened.

== Common names ==
Trimeresurus malcolmi is known by several common names, including Kinabalu green pit viper, Malcolm's pitviper, Malcolm's tree viper, Mt. Kinabalu pit viper, and Malcolm's pit viper.

== Geographic range ==
Trimeresurus malcolmi is found in East Malaysia at elevations of 1,000–1,600 metres (3,280–5,250 feet). The type locality given is "Sungii River, near Bundutuan, Mount Kinabalu, British North Borneo Sabah, at an altitude circa 3,000 feet [914 m]".

== Habitat ==
The preferred natural habitat of Trimeresurus malcolmi is forest.

== Reproduction ==
Trimeresurus malcolmi is oviparous.
