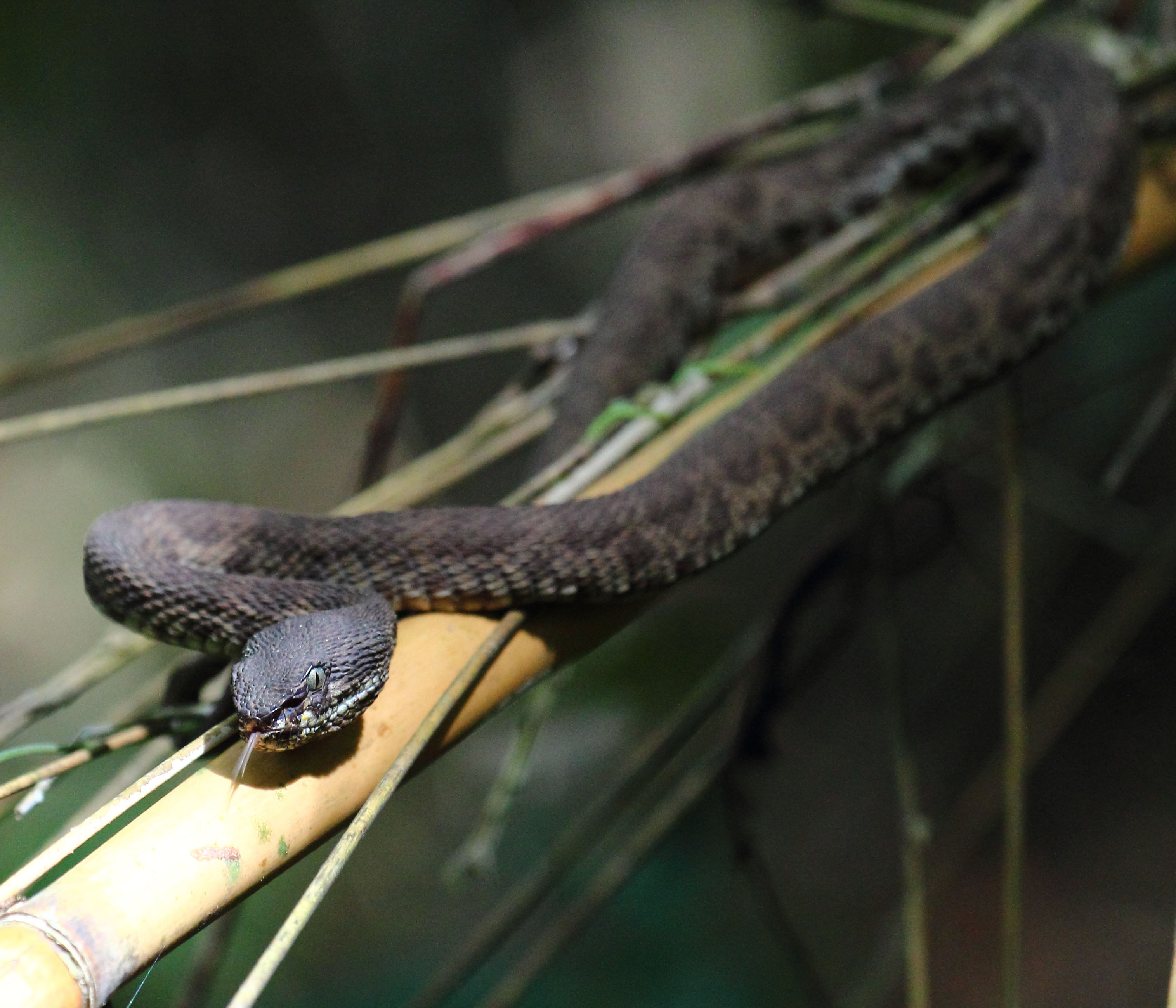

Conservation status
- Least Concern (IUCN 3.1)

Scientific classification
- Kingdom: Animalia
- Phylum: Chordata
- Class: Reptilia
- Order: Squamata
- Suborder: Serpentes
- Family: Viperidae
- Genus: Trimeresurus
- Species: T. purpureomaculatus

Binomial name
- Trimeresurus purpureomaculatus (Gray, 1832)

Synonyms
- Trigonocephalus purpureo-maculatus Gray, 1832; Trimesurus purpureus Gray, 1842; Trimesurus carinatus Gray, 1842; C[ryptelytrops]. carinatus – Cope, 1860; [Trimesurus] porphyraceus Blyth, 1861; Trimeresurus purpureus – Günther, 1864; T[rimeresurus]. carinatus – Theobald, 1868; Crotalus Trimeres[urus]. carinatus – Higgins, 1873; Trimeresurus purpureomaculatus – Boulenger, 1890; Lachesis purpureomaculatus – Boulenger, 1896; Trimeresurus purpureomaculatus – M.A. Smith, 1943; Trimeresurus purpureomaculatus purpureomaculatus – M.A. Smith, 1943; Cryptelytrops purpureomaculatus – Malhotra & Thorpe, 2004; Trimeresurus (Trimeresurus) purpureomaculatus – David et al.

= Trimeresurus purpureomaculatus =

Species of snake

Trimeresurus purpureomaculatus is a venomous pit viper species native to India, Bangladesh and Southeast Asia. Common names include: mangrove pit viper, mangrove viper, and shore pit viper.

== Description ==
Males grow to a total length of 66.5 centimetres (26.2 in), females 90 centimetres (35 in). The maximum tail lengths are then 12.5 centimetres (4.9 in) and 14 centimetres (5.5 in) respectively.

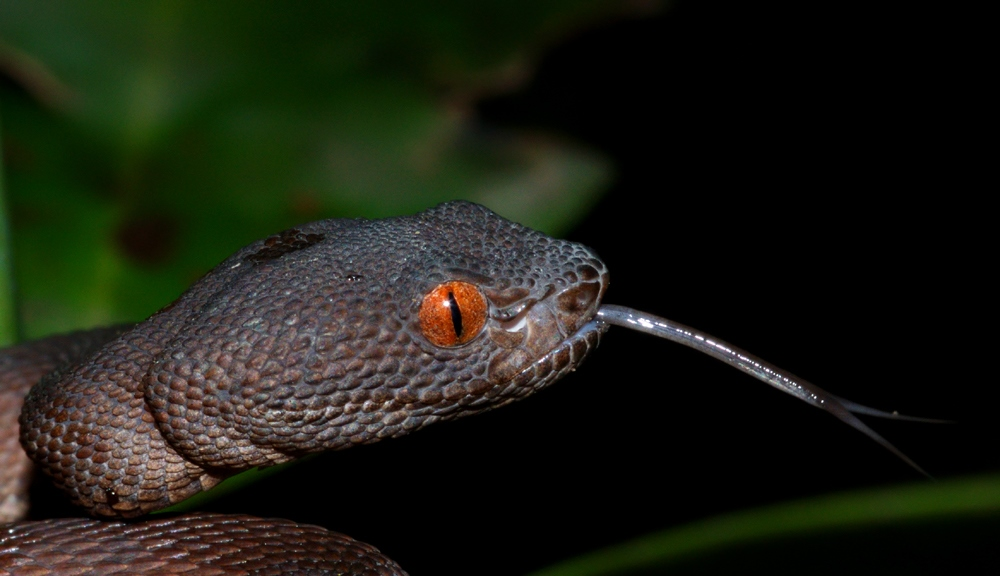
Small individual from Singapore

Scales in 25-27 longitudinal rows at midbody; 11-13 upper labials, the first partially or completely united with the nasal; supraocular very narrow, sometimes broken into small scales, 12-15 scales between them; head scales small, subequal, tuberculate or granular; temporal scales keeled.

Body color highly variable: above olive, grayish, to dark purplish brown; below whitish, greenish or brown, uniform or spotted with brown; a light line on scale row one bordering ventrals present or absent; head olive, heavily suffused with brown.

Ventrals: males 160-179, females 168-183; subcaudals: males 74-76, females 56-63, paired; hemipenes without spines.

== Common names ==
Mangrove pit viper, mangrove viper, shore pit viper, purple-spotted pit viper, shore pitviper.

== Geographic range ==
Found in Bangladesh, India, Burma, Thailand, West Malaysia, Singapore and Indonesia (Sumatra and Java). The type locality is listed as "Singapore".
