= Banded cat-eyed snake =

There are two species of snake named banded cat-eyed snake:

- Leptodeira annulata
- Leptodeira ashmeadii
