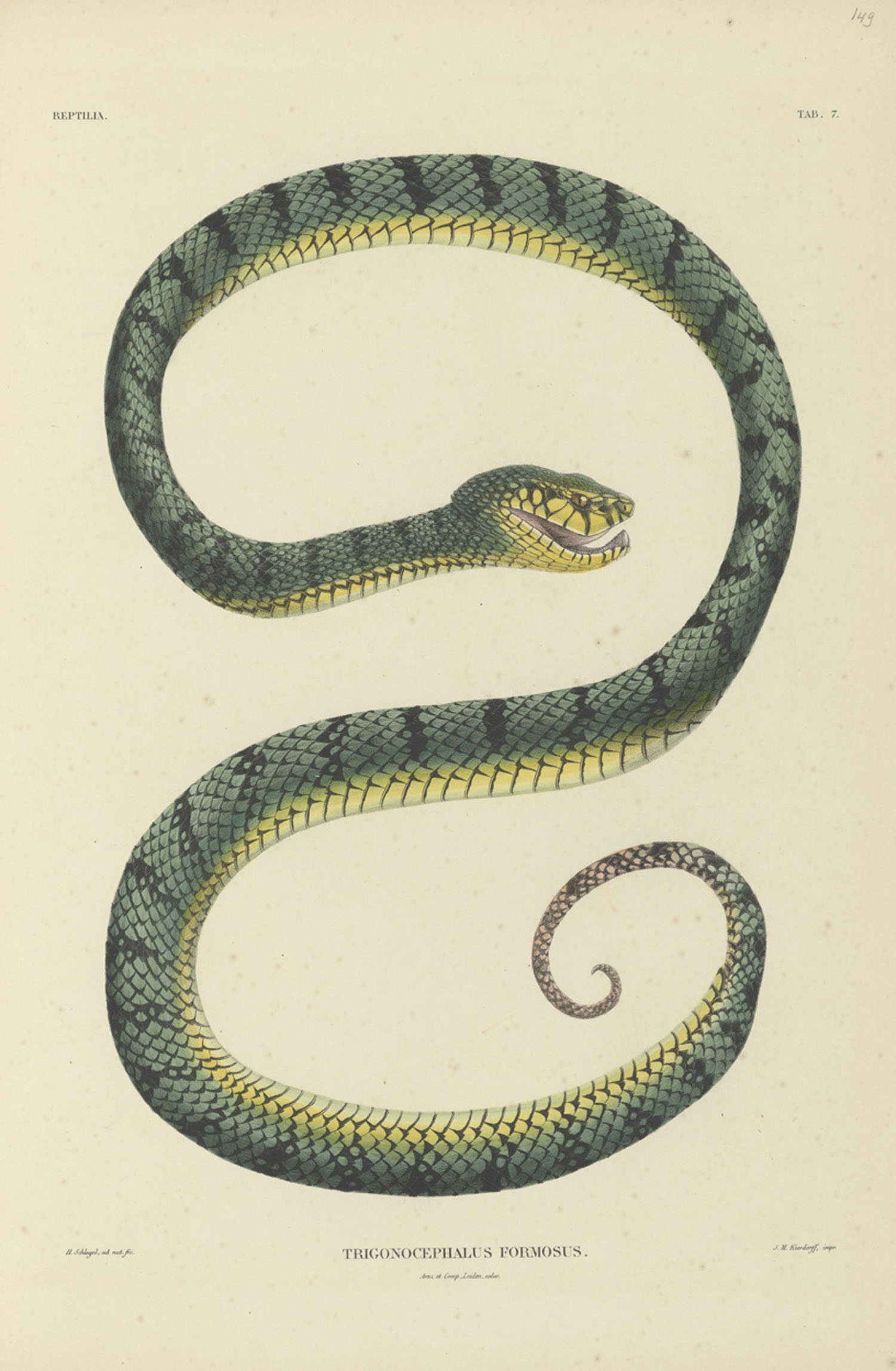
- Artist's rendition

Conservation status
- Least Concern (IUCN 3.1)

Scientific classification
- Kingdom: Animalia
- Phylum: Chordata
- Class: Reptilia
- Order: Squamata
- Suborder: Serpentes
- Family: Viperidae
- Genus: Trimeresurus
- Species: T. sumatranus

Binomial name
- Trimeresurus sumatranus (Raffles, 1822)

Synonyms
- C[oluber]. Sumatranus Raffles, 1822; C[oluber]. sumatranus – H. Boie, 1826; Trigonocephalus formosus J.P. Müller & Schlegel In Temminck, 1842; Trimeresurus Sumatranus – Gray, 1842; Trigonocephalus formosus – J.P. Müller & Schlegel In Temminck, 1845; Trigonocephalus sumatranus – Cantor, 1847; Trimeresurus formosus – Gray, 1849; B[othrops]. formosus – Jan, 1863; Bothrops sumatranus – Lidth de Jeude, 1866; Lachesis sumatranus – Boulenger, 1896; Trimeresurus sumatranus – M.A. Smith, 1922; Trimeresurus sumatranus sumatranus – Loveridge, 1938; Trimeresurus sumatranus sumatranus – Golay et al., 1993; Parias sumatranus – Malhotra & Thorpe, 2004; Trimeresurus (Parias) sumatranus – David et al., 2011

= Trimeresurus sumatranus =

Species of snake

Trimeresurus sumatranus is a species of venomous pitviper (a subfamily of vipers within the larger Viperidae family) found in the tropical forests of Indonesia, Malaysia and Thailand. Arboreal by nature, its coloration is pale to neon-green, with some black vertical markings, and a red-tipped tail. As with other vipers, this species has prominent, "keeled" scales, which appear somewhat raised and give the snake a rough-textured appearance. Common names include Sumatran pitviper, Sumatran tree viper, and Sumatran pit viper.

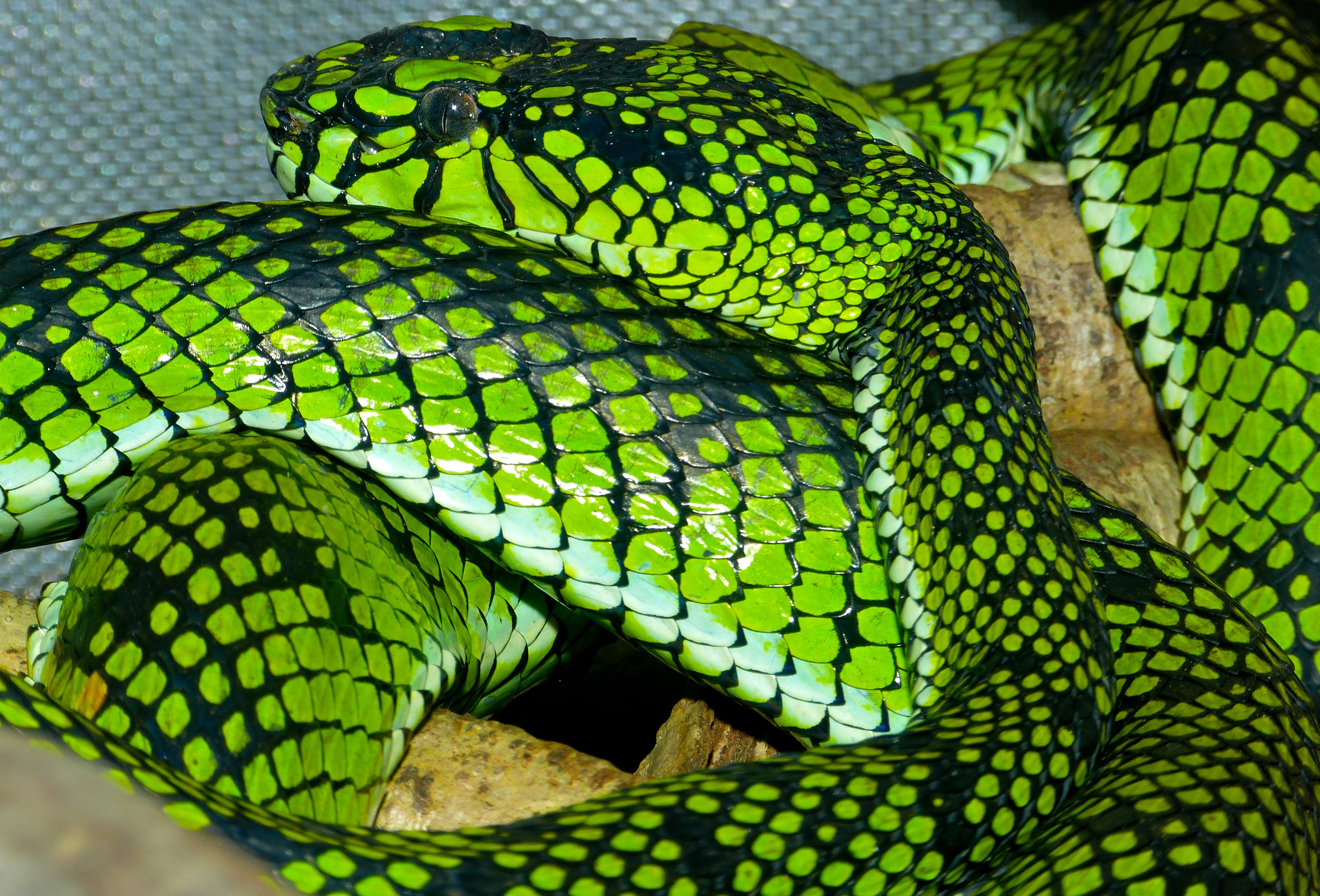
Sumatran pit viper (Trimeresurus sumatranus) Courtesy Thai National Parks Photograph by Bernard Dupont

== Description ==
Trimeresurus sumatranus is a large heavy-bodied pitviper, with a prehensile tail. Adults may attain 1.6 metres (5 feet 3 inches) SVL (snout–vent length), with fangs over 10 mm (3/8 in) long.

It is an arboreal species that is pale green in color with a red tail. The dorsal scales are edged with black, which may form crossbands in more mature specimens. There is a white or yellow stripe on each side along the first row of dorsal scales. Ventrally it is greenish or yellowish, and the ventral scales may be thinly edged with black.

Scalation includes 21 (23) rows of dorsal scales at midbody, 183–190/182–191 ventral scales in males/females, 57–66/55–64 subcaudal scales in males/females, and 8–10 supralabial scales.

== Habitat ==
In Borneo it inhabits lowland forests at elevations below 800 meters (2,600 feet).

== Behavior ==
It is nocturnal, climbing onto low branches to hunt its prey.

== Diet ==
The diet consists mainly of arboreal small mammals, birds, and tree frogs.

== Geographic range ==
Found in southern Thailand, West and East Malaysia (Sabah and Sarawak on Borneo) and Indonesia (Bangka, Billiton, Borneo, Sumatra and the nearby islands of Simalur, Nias, and possibly the Mentawai Islands [Sipora]). The type locality given is "Sumatra."

According to Gumprecht et al. (2004), the records regarding its occurrence in the Mentawai Islands are probably based on T. hageni.

== Venom ==
Because it is a large snake with large fangs, Trimeresurus sumatranus can inject large quantities of venom. Fatalities from its bite have been reported, and it should be considered extremely dangerous.
