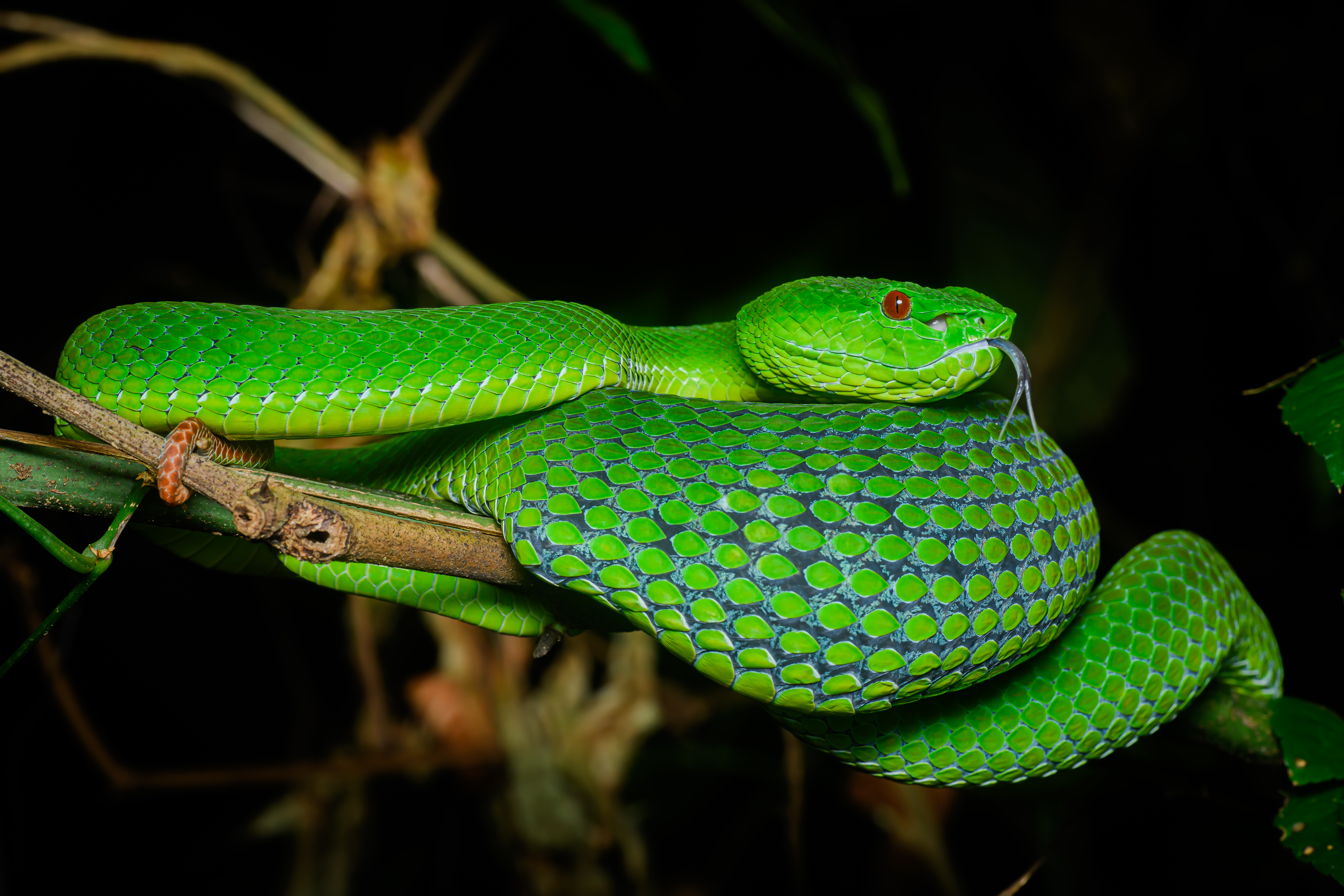

Conservation status
- Least Concern (IUCN 3.1)

Scientific classification
- Kingdom: Animalia
- Phylum: Chordata
- Class: Reptilia
- Order: Squamata
- Suborder: Serpentes
- Family: Viperidae
- Genus: Trimeresurus
- Species: T. popeiorum

Binomial name
- Trimeresurus popeiorum M.A. Smith, 1937

Synonyms
- Trimesurus elegans (part) — Gray, 1853; Trimeresurus gramineus (part) — C. Pope & S. Pope, 1933; Trimeresurus popeiorum [sic] M.A. Smith, 1937; Trimeresurus popeorum [sic] M.A. Smith, 1943; Trimeresurus popeorum — Taylor & Elbel, 1958; Trimeresurus popeorum popeorum — Regenass & Kramer, 1981; Trimeresurus popeorum popeorum — Golay et al., 1993; Popeia popeiorum — Malhotra & Thorpe, 2004; Trimeresurus popeiorum — David et al., 2009; Trimeresurus (Popeia) popeiorum — David et al., 2011

= Trimeresurus popeiorum =

Species of snake

Trimeresurus popeiorum is a species of venomous pit viper in the family Viperidae. The species is native to northern and northeastern parts of India and Southeast Asia. Common names include: Pope's pit viper, Pope's green pit viper, Pope's tree viper and Pope's bamboo pitviper.

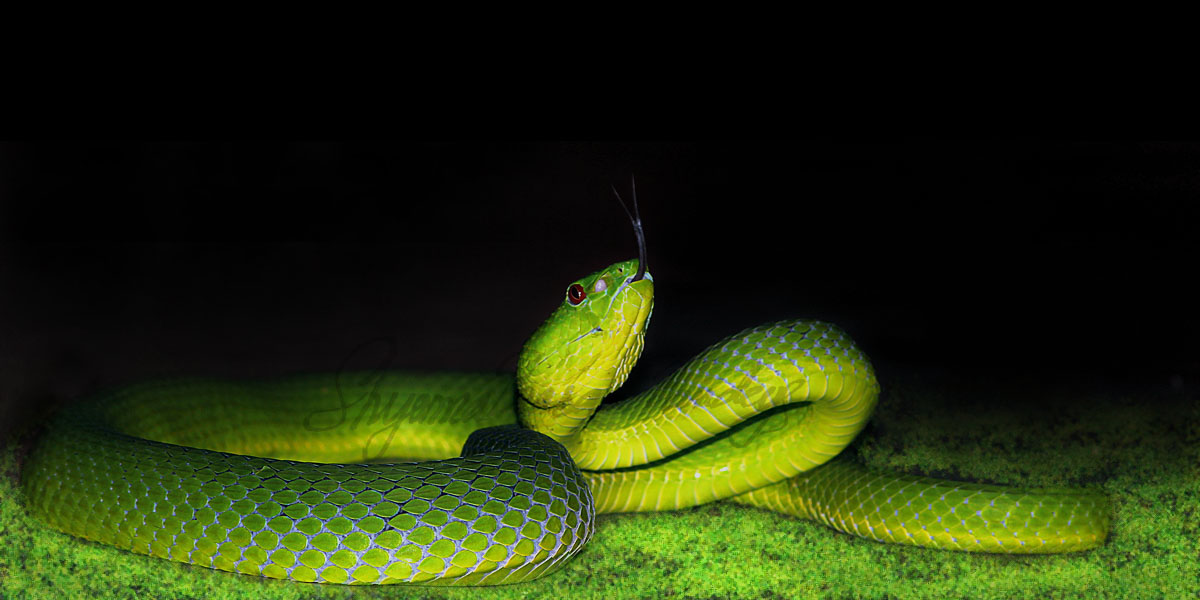
Female

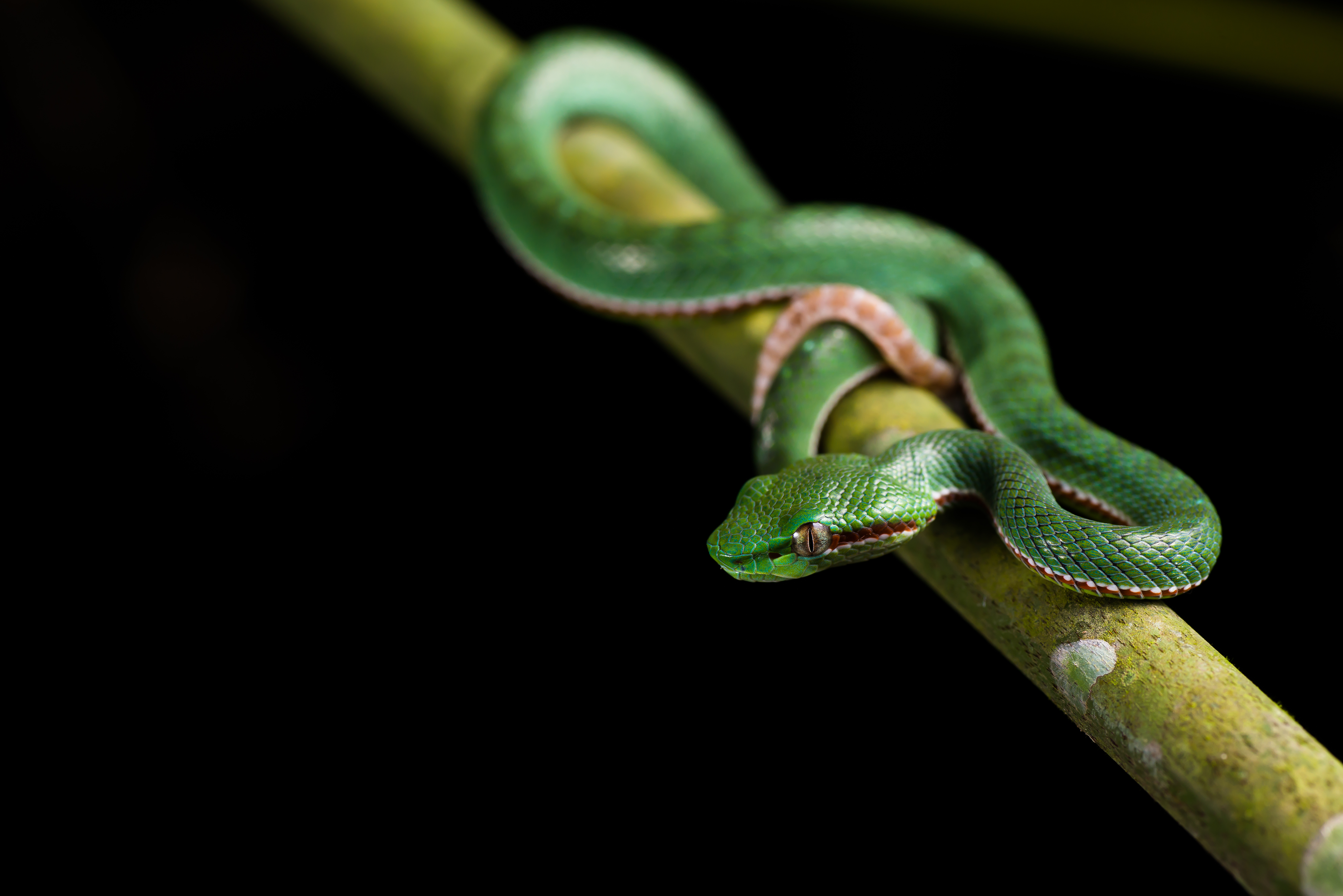
Juvenile male

== Description ==
Trimeresurus popeiorum may grow to a total length of 770 mm (30 in), which includes a tail length 170 mm (6.7 in).

Above green, below pale green to whitish, the two separated by a bright bicolored orange or brown (below) and white (above) (males) or white (females) ventrolateral stripe, which occupies the whole of the outermost scale row and a portion of the second row.

Dorsal scales in 21 (rarely 23) longitudinal rows at midbody; 9–11 upper labials, first upper labials separated from nasals by a distinct suture; a single supraocular. Ventrals 155–169; subcaudals 52–76, in males the base of the tail enlarged to the level of subcaudals 20–25; hemipenes long and slender, smooth, without spines.

This species is most often confused with T. s. stejnegeri (q.v.); the two have quite distinct hemipenes, which does not make identification of individuals in the field or in the laboratory any easier without recourse to (a) male individuals and (b) an examination of the hemipenes. However, the two species are not known to have overlapping distributions, at least based on available materials. Also, closely allied to T. popeiorum is Trimeresurus yunnanensis (q.v.); ordinarily, the two are more easily told apart by the number of midbody dorsal scale rows, 21 in T. popeiorum, 19 in T. yunnanensis.

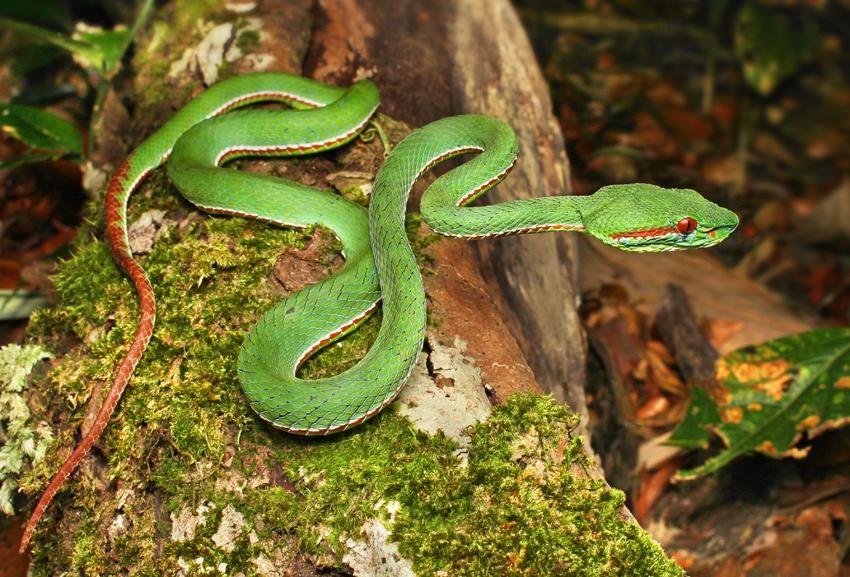
Adult male Pope's pit viper, Trimeresurus popeiorum

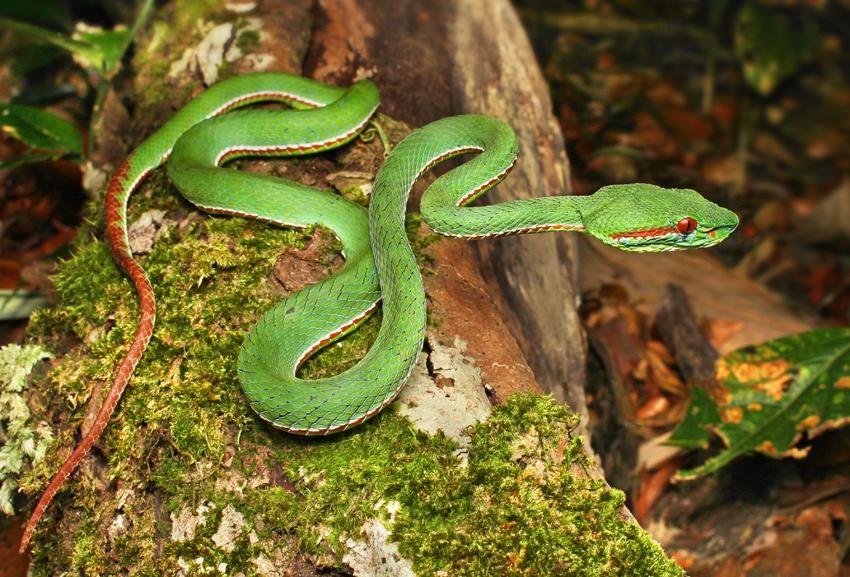
Adult male Trimeresurus popeiorum

== Geographic range ==
Trimeresurus popeiorum is found in Northeastern India (Meghalaya, Arunachal Pradesh, Mizoram, Darjiling), northern Myanmar, Thailand, and Laos. It probably also occurs in Nepal and Yunnan (China), but there are no reliable records from those areas.

The type locality, designated by lectotype, is listed as "Khasi Hills, Assam" (India).

== Taxonomy and etymology ==
The specific name, popeiorum (Latin, genitive, plural), is in honor of two American herpetologists, Clifford H. Pope and Sarah H. Pope, his wife.

There are differences in opinion as to the correct spelling of the specific epithet. The following is from David and Vogel (1996):

This species was named in honour to Clifford H. Pope and Sarah H. Pope. The original spelling of the specific epithet, popeiorum, was corrected into popeorum by Smith (1943:518) on the basis that it was indeed a clerical error. Unfortunately, according to the Art. 32 (c, ii) of the Code (ICZN, 1985), such a change does not fall into the category of a "correction of an incorrect original spelling." According to the Art. 33 (d), the use of a termination -orum in a subsequent spelling of a species-group name that is a genitive based upon a personal name in which the correct original spelling terminates with -iorum, is an incorrect subsequent spelling, even if the change is deliberate. The original spelling, popeiorum, must therefore be conserved.

== Habitat ==
Trimeresurus popeiorum is found in forests of mountainous regions.

== Behavior ==
Trimeresurus popeiorum is nocturnal and arboreal. If threatened, it will vibrate its tail.

== Diet ==
Trimeresurus popeiorum preys upon frogs, lizards, birds, and rodents (especially rats and squirrels).

== Reproduction ==
This species, T. popeiorum, is viviparous. In India, sexually mature females give birth in April and May, and the average clutch size is 10. The hatchlings are about 180 mm (7.1 in) long.

== Venom ==
Trimeresurus popeiorum possesses a potent hemotoxic venom which is dangerous to humans.
