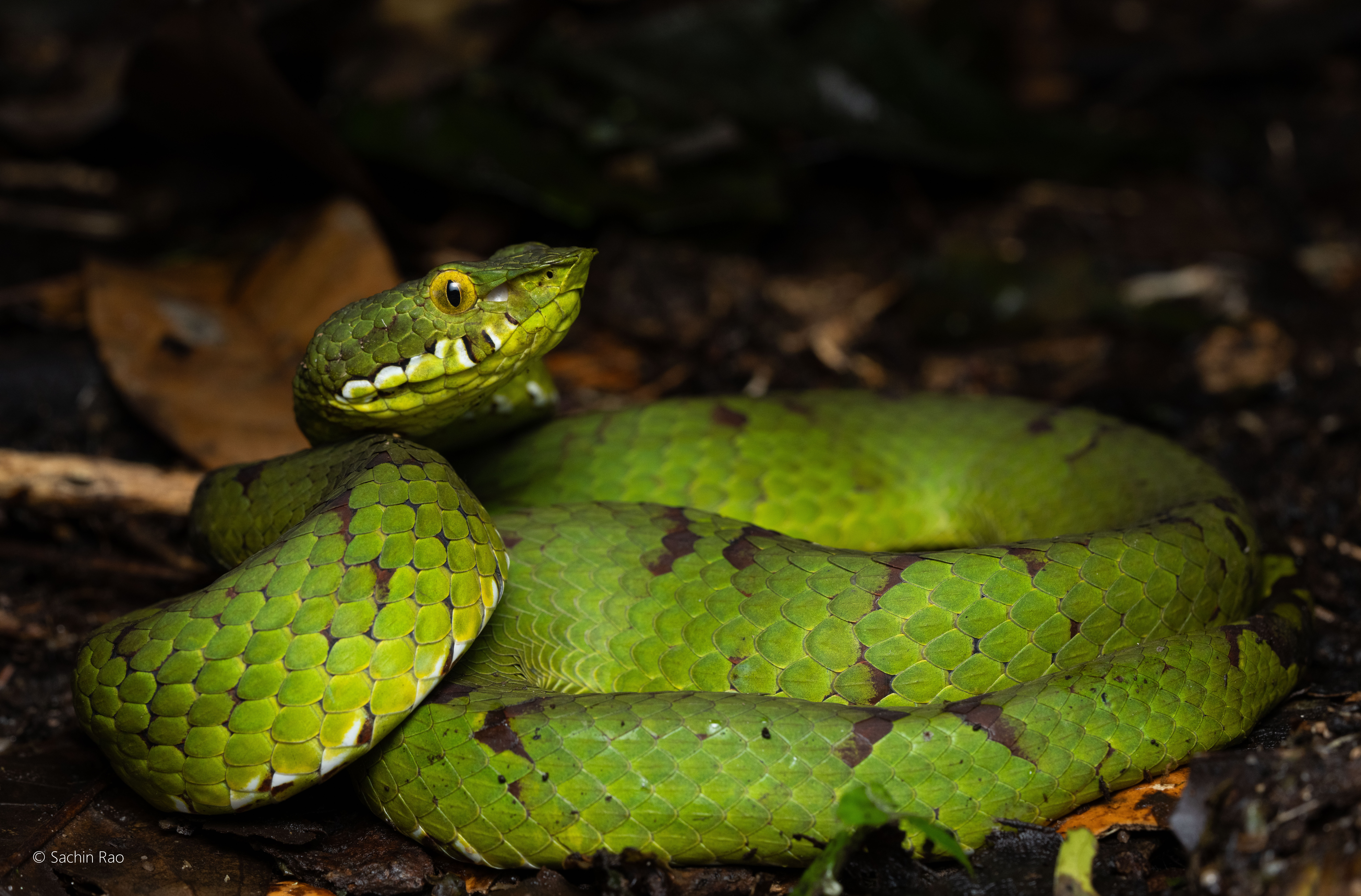

Conservation status
- Data Deficient (IUCN 3.1)

Scientific classification
- Kingdom: Animalia
- Phylum: Chordata
- Class: Reptilia
- Order: Squamata
- Suborder: Serpentes
- Family: Viperidae
- Genus: Trimeresurus
- Species: T. arunachalensis

Binomial name
- Trimeresurus arunachalensis Captain, Deepak, Pandit, Bhatt, and Athreya, 2019

= Trimeresurus arunachalensis =

Species of snake

Trimeresurus arunachalensis, the Arunachal pitviper, is a species of venomous pit viper endemic to the Indian state of Arunachal Pradesh. It is only known from the village of Ramda in the West Kameng district, where a single specimen was discovered during biodiversity surveys.

== Discovery and Naming ==
The holotype of the Arunachal pit viper was first discovered in a biodiversity survey near Ramda, West Kamang, Arunchal Pradesh, India in an elevation of 1,876 m (6,155 ft). The male specimen was designated APF/SFRI-1871 and is currently kept in State Forest Research Institute, Itanagar, Arunachal Pradesh, India. The specific epithet arunachalensis was named after the state it was found in being Arunachal Pradesh.

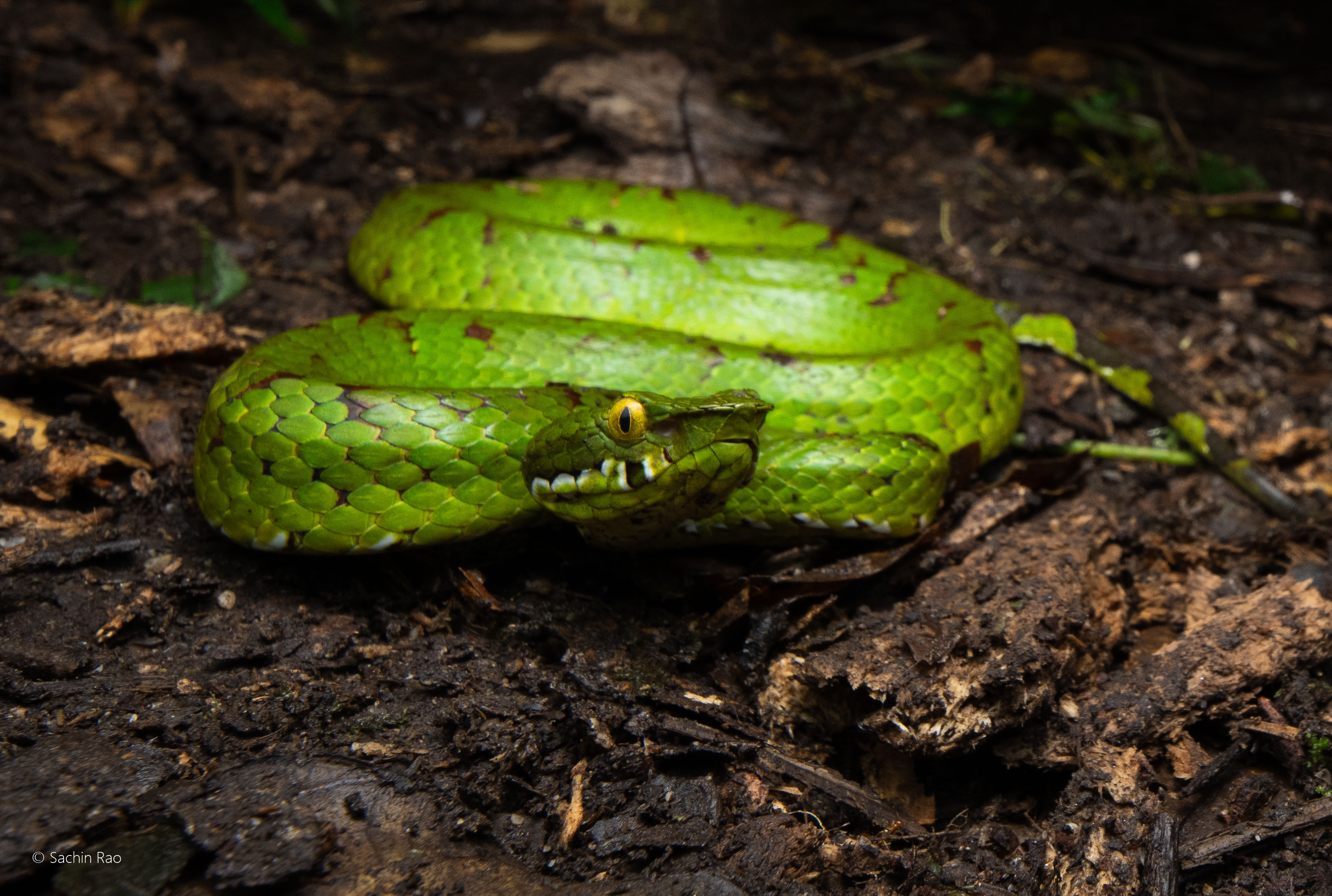
Trimeresurus arunachalensis in its natural habitat.

== Description ==
The Arunchal pitviper can be distinguished by other species of pit vipers by its distinct hemipenis with it being unforked, slender, and no macroscopic spines. The species is also potentially polychromistic, with the holotype sporting a brownish dorsal coloration with glossy orange-reddish-brown sides and belly and faint dark brown markings on the dorsum, but other unconfirmed reports show the species with a bright green with brown markings and underbelly, with both having a white line bordering the ventral scales. The species also supports a uniquely pointed snout, a well defined canthus ridge which overhangs the loreal region. The species also possess acutely keeled scales and while the dorsal scales on the head, body and tail are dull, the ventral, rostral and subcaudal scales are glossy. This species may also present variable dorsal scales rows, with the holotype possessing 17, while another potential specimen possessing 19. This species can grow up to 648 mm long.

== Taxonomy ==
Genetic analysis indicates that the closest relative of this species is the Tibetan bamboo pit viper (T. tibetanus).

== Habitat and Distribution ==
This species posses a highly limited range with sightings currently only known from West Kameng, Arunchal Pradesh, India. This species is a highly enigmatic species having only been possibly spotted less than 10 times. This species has been confirmed to live in subtropical broadleaf hill forest with the type locality being steep, and mildly disturbed by human activity.

== Ecology ==
Being only known from few specimens, the ecology of this species is highly enigmatic. However the holotype was both discovered on the ground, and had coloration that may have helped it camouflage with the leaf litter which suggests this species may be terrestrial.

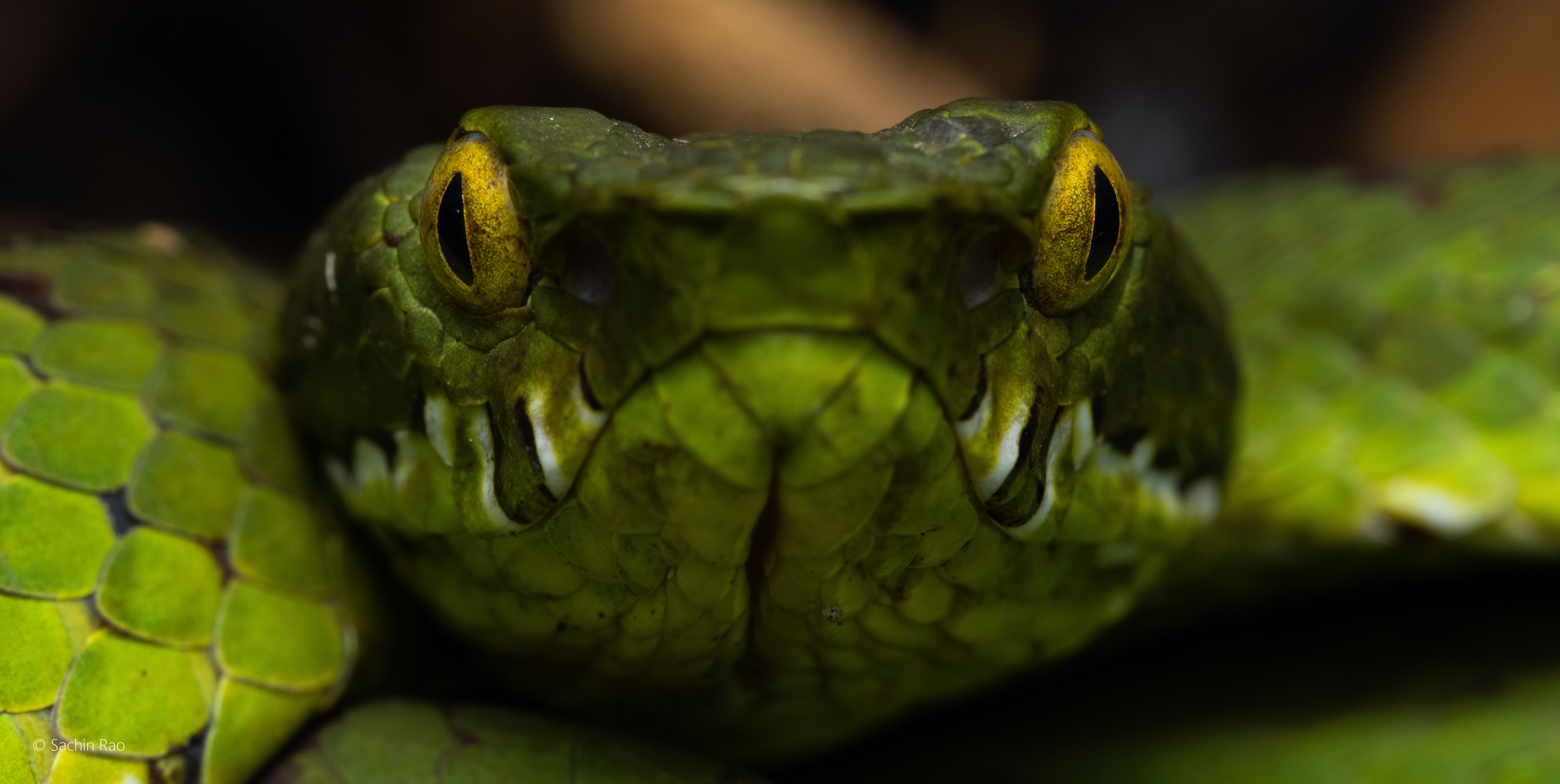
Trimeresurus arunachalensis is known to have different morphs. There was a red morph described earlier and a mixed red-green morph.
