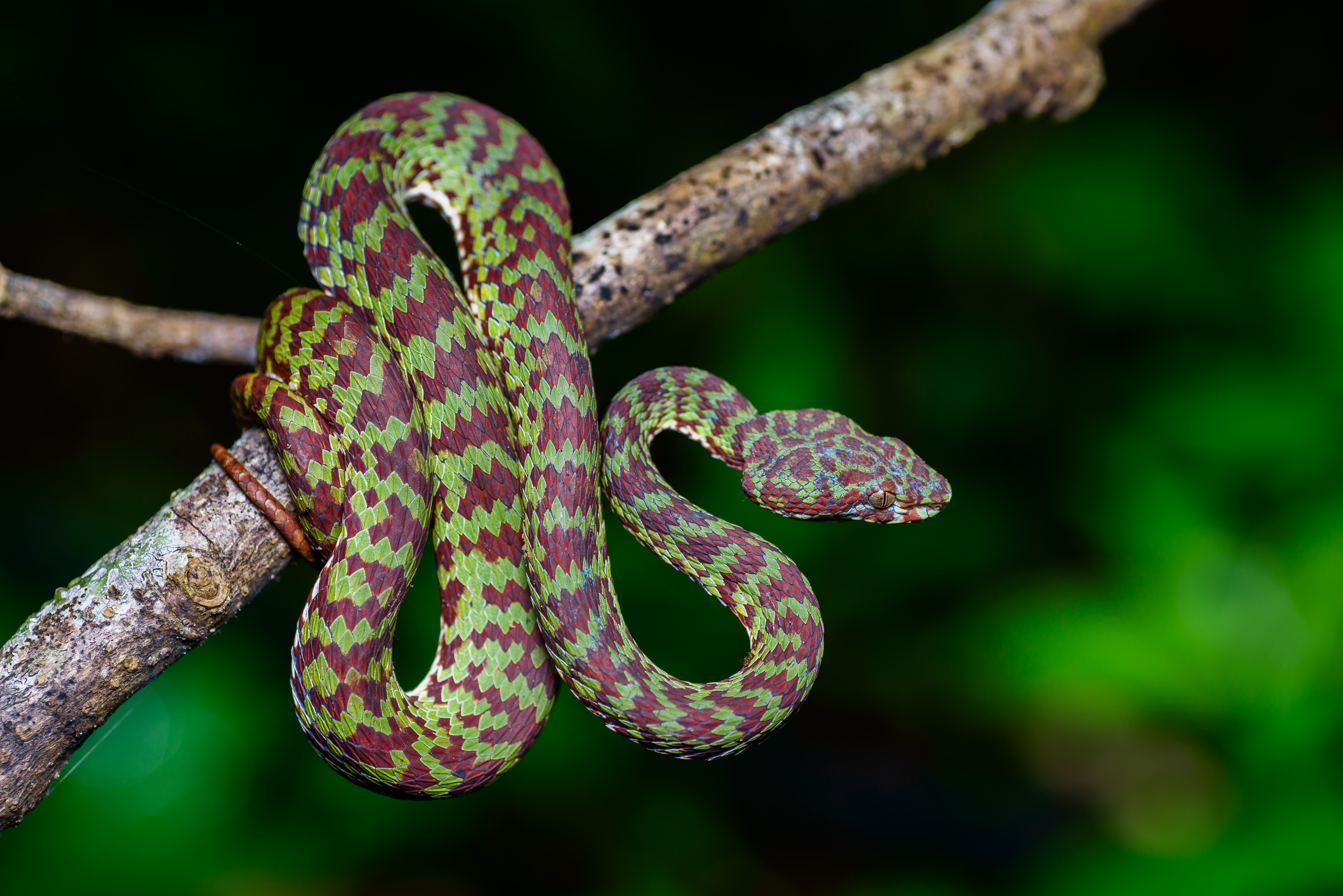

Conservation status
- Vulnerable (IUCN 3.1)

Scientific classification
- Kingdom: Animalia
- Phylum: Chordata
- Class: Reptilia
- Order: Squamata
- Suborder: Serpentes
- Family: Viperidae
- Genus: Trimeresurus
- Species: T. venustus

Binomial name
- Trimeresurus venustus Vogel, 1991

Synonyms
- Cryptelytrops venustus

= Trimeresurus venustus =

Species of snake

Trimeresurus venustus is a venomous pit viper species endemic to southern Thailand. Its common names include beautiful pit viper and brown-spotted pit viper.

== Taxonomy ==
This species was considered a synonym of Trimeresurus kanburiensis until around the turn of the century. It was described by Gernot Vögel in 1991. It is in the subgenus Trimeresurus.

== Etymology ==
Derived from Latin, the name venustus means beautiful, and refers to the striking, intricate color scheme.

== Description ==
This species has a slender body and is approximately 580 mm (23 in) in length. They have a triangular-shaped head, like all pit vipers. Their labials are green with brown patches and a dark postorbital stripe is present.

Their distinctive coloration ranges from vibrant green to olive green with brown or reddish-orange bands along the length of the body. In males, the dorsal area is an olive or bluish-green color, while females have a grass-green dorsal area. Their short snout is slightly flattened with a small ridge, and they have heat-sensing pits in-between their nostrils. Their irises are a light orange with brown specks. The dorsal scales are strongly keeled and have a count of 21 – 21 – 15.

== Distribution and habitat ==
T. venustus is native to southern Thailand and is also found in northern peninsular Malaysia. Being mainly arboreal, they can be found up to 700 m (2,300 ft) in elevation inhabiting limestone hills, shaded, humid valleys, rubber tree plantations, and both primary and secondary rainforests.

== Biology ==
=== Feeding ===
Using heat-sensing pits, these pitvipers hunt mice, frogs, and lizards.

=== Reproduction ===
T. venustus is ovoviviparous.

=== Venom ===
A bite resulted in swelling and a discoloration of the skin. Local symptoms were displayed, such as coagulopathy. Their venom has a moderate level of toxicity, and all bites should be treated as potentially dangerous. Green pit viper antivenom is used as treatment.
