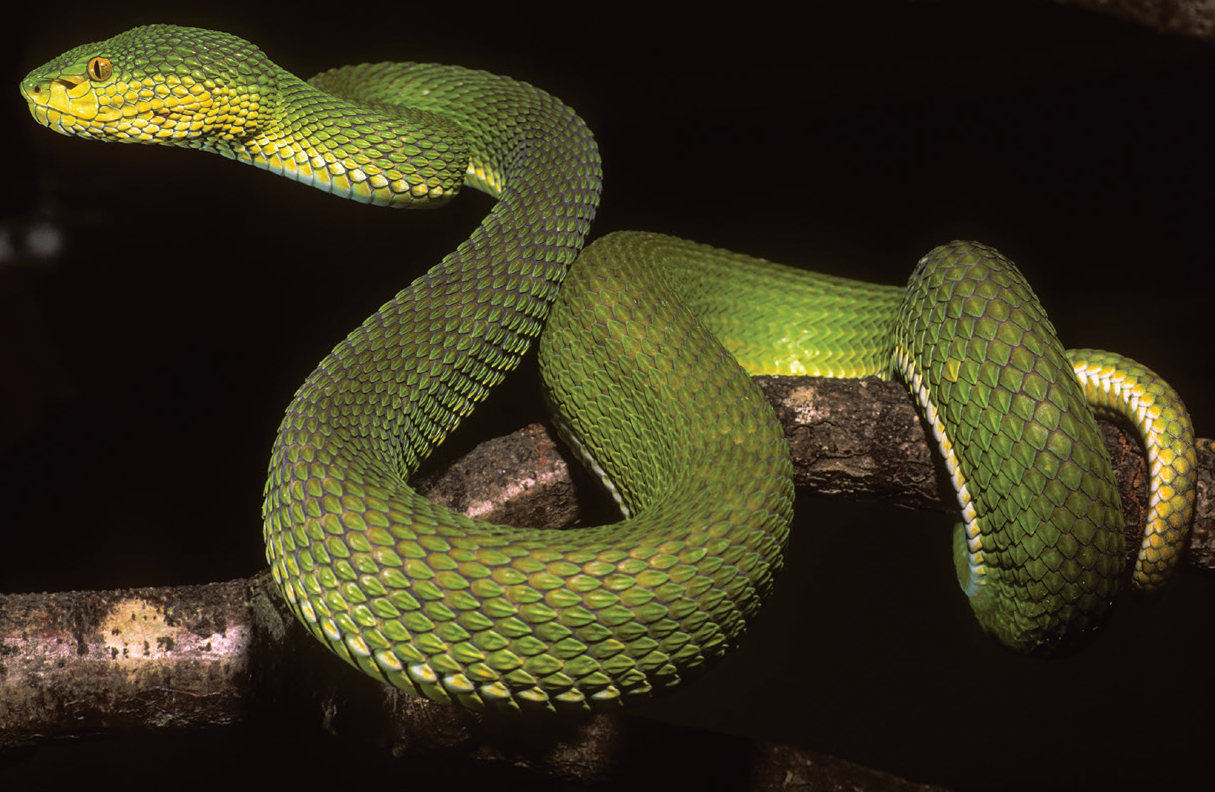

Scientific classification
- Kingdom: Animalia
- Phylum: Chordata
- Class: Reptilia
- Order: Squamata
- Suborder: Serpentes
- Family: Viperidae
- Genus: Trimeresurus
- Species: T. ayerwadyensis

Binomial name
- Trimeresurus ayerwadyensis Chan, S. Anuar, A. Sankar, I. T. Law, I. S. Law, R. Shivaram, C. Christian, D. G. Mulcahy, and A. Malhotra, 2023

= Trimeresurus ayerwadyensis =

Species of snake

Trimeresurus ayerwadyensis, also known commonly as the Ayerwady green pit viper or Southern Myanmar green pit viper, is a species of snake.

== Description ==
In terms of color pattern, Trimeresurus ayeyarwadyensis shares characteristics with both T. purpureomaculatus and T. erythrurus. For example, specimen CAS 213410 from Yangon is bright green with no dorsal markings (Fig. 4A) and is virtually identical to T. erythrurus (Fig. 4B). A photograph of an unvouchered live specimen from Yangon corroborates this observation (Fig. 5). Contrastingly, CAS 219764 from Pyapon District in the Ayeyarwady Region has a dark or olive-green base dorsal coloration with distinct dark blotches (Fig. 4C) reminiscent of T. purpureomaculatus—albeit T. purpureomaculatus does not have a green base dorsal coloration (Chan et al. 2022). On the other hand, CAS 212245 from Myaungmya District in the Ayeyarwady Region appears to be an intermediate of the other two specimens in having a dark or olive-green base dorsal coloration with no distinct blotches (Fig. 4D). Despite these variations, all three specimens were unambiguously shown to represent a distinct, monophyletic lineage that is not conspecific with either T. purpureomaculatus or T. erythrurus (Chan et al. 2023). The distinct evolutionary trajectory of the new species coupled with the lack of morphological differentiation makes T. ayeyarwadyensis sp. nov. an archetypal example of a true cryptic species.

== Distribution and habitat ==
Trimeresurus ayeyarwadyensis occurs at Hlawga Park in the Yangon Region and Pyapon and Myaungmya districts in the Ayeyarwady Region. The northern and western limits of its distribution likely lie somewhere in between the Myaugmya and Pathein districts in the Ayeyarwady Region. Southward, it could occur in mangroves in Mon State.

== Behavior ==
The behavior of Trimeresurus ayerwadyensis is unknown.
