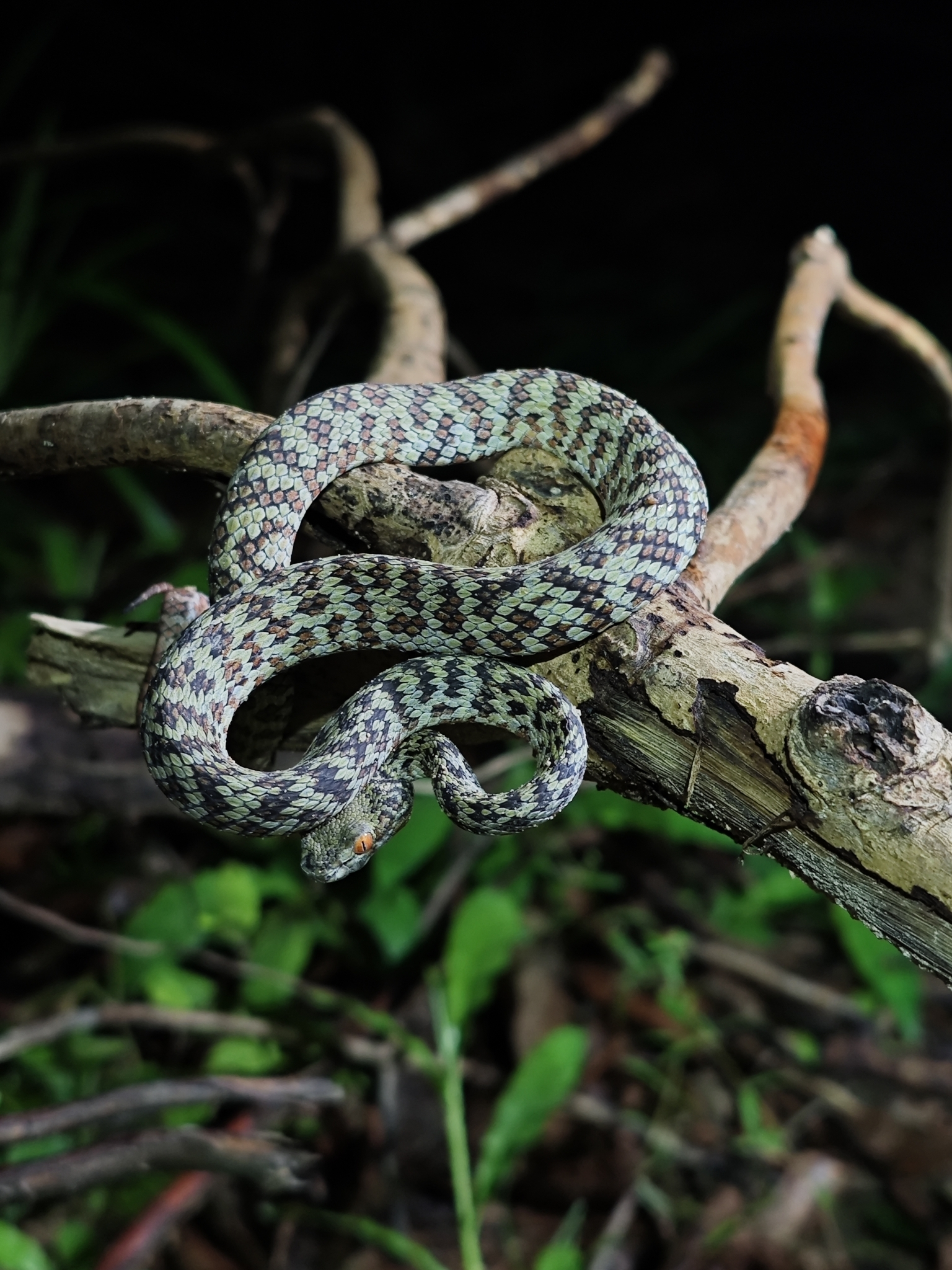

Scientific classification
- Kingdom: Animalia
- Phylum: Chordata
- Class: Reptilia
- Order: Squamata
- Suborder: Serpentes
- Family: Viperidae
- Genus: Trimeresurus
- Species: T. honsonensis

Binomial name
- Trimeresurus honsonensis (L. L. Grismer, Ngo & J. L. Grismer, 2008)

= Trimeresurus honsonensis =

Species of snake

Trimeresurus honsonensis (also known as the Hon Son pit viper) is a species of pit viper found in southern Vietnam.
