= Trimeresurus sichuanensis =

Scientific classification
- Domain: Eukaryota
- Kingdom: Animalia
- Phylum: Chordata
- Class: Reptilia
- Order: Squamata
- Suborder: Serpentes
- Family: Viperidae
- Genus: Trimeresurus
- Species: T. sichuanensis

Binomial name
- Trimeresurus sichuanensis (Guo and Wang, 2011)

Species of snake

Trimeresurus sichuanensis (also known as the Sichuan pit viper) is a species of pit viper found in Sichuan, China.
