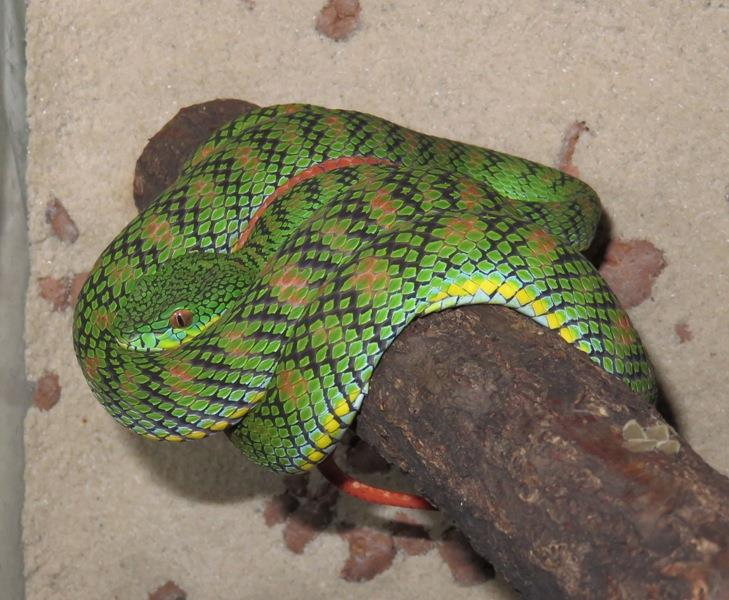

Conservation status
- Least Concern (IUCN 3.1)

Scientific classification
- Kingdom: Animalia
- Phylum: Chordata
- Class: Reptilia
- Order: Squamata
- Suborder: Serpentes
- Family: Viperidae
- Genus: Trimeresurus
- Species: T. schultzei

Binomial name
- Trimeresurus schultzei Griffin, 1909
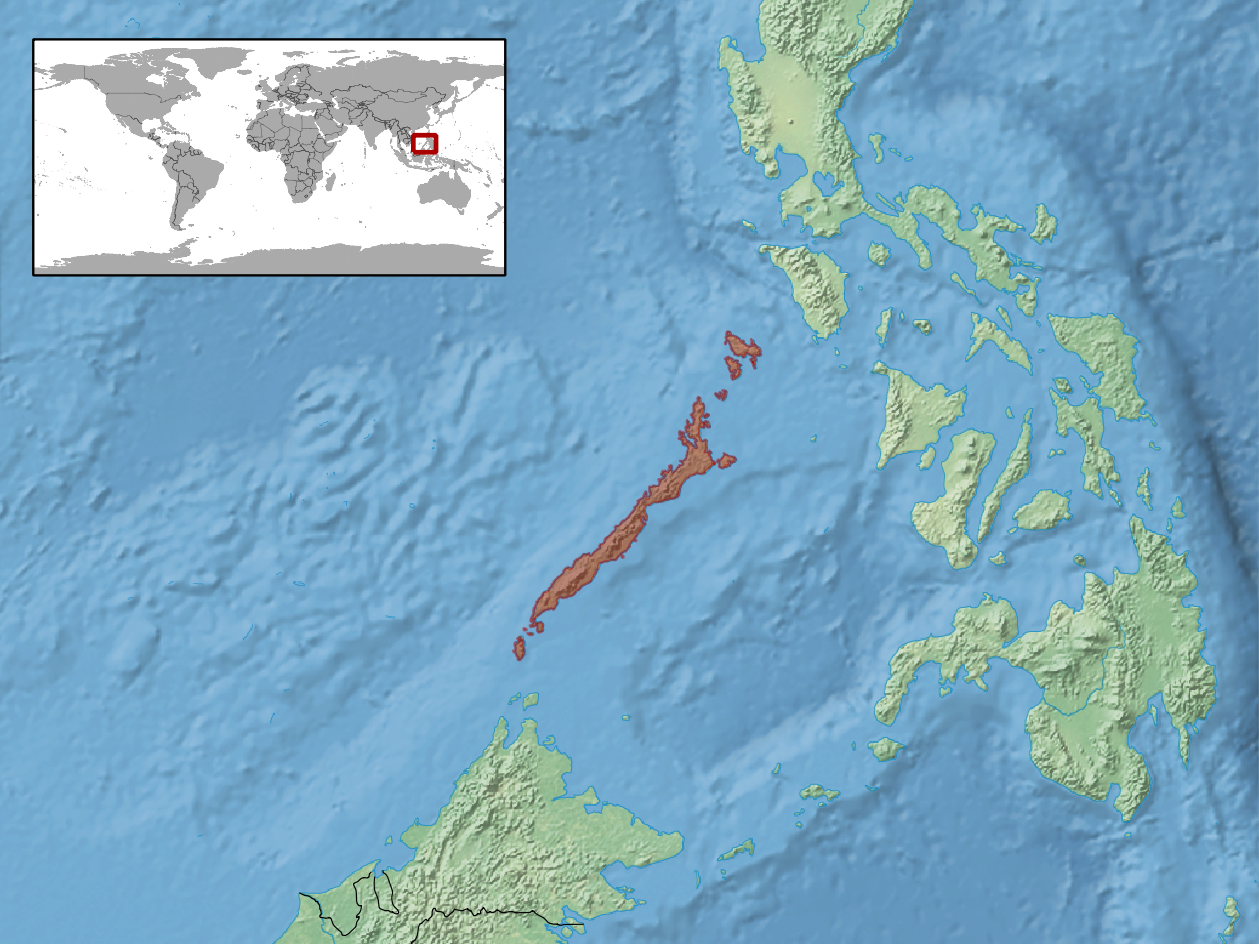

Synonyms
- Trimeresurus schultzei Griffin, 1909; Parias schultzei – Malhotra & Thorpe, 2004; Trimeresurus (Parias) schultzei – David et al., 2011

= Trimeresurus schultzei =

Species of snake

Trimeresurus schultzei, commonly known as the Schultze's pitviper, is a venomous pitviper species endemic to the Philippines. No subspecies are currently recognized.

== Etymology ==
The specific name, schultzei, is in honor of "Mr. W. Schultze" who collected the type specimen.

== Description ==
Scalation includes 21 rows of dorsal scales at midbody, 185-194/192-203 ventral scales in males/females, 67-78/66-75 subcaudal scales in males/females, and 9-11 supralabial scales.

== Geographic range ==
Found in the Philippines on the islands on Palawan and Balabac. The type locality given is "Iwahig, Palawn" (Palawan Island, Philippines).
