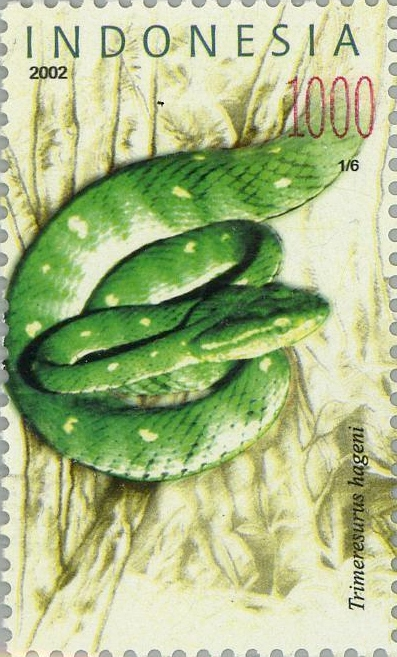

Conservation status
- Least Concern (IUCN 3.1)

Scientific classification
- Kingdom: Animalia
- Phylum: Chordata
- Class: Reptilia
- Order: Squamata
- Suborder: Serpentes
- Family: Viperidae
- Genus: Trimeresurus
- Species: T. hageni

Binomial name
- Trimeresurus hageni (Lidth de Jeude, 1886)

Synonyms
- Bothrops Hageni Lidth de Jeude, 1886; Lachesis sumatranus (part) — Boulenger, 1896; Trimeresurus hageni — Brongersma, 1933; Parias hageni — Malhotra & Thorpe, 2004; Trimeresurus (Parias) hageni — David et al., 2011

= Trimeresurus hageni =

Species of snake

Trimeresurus hageni, commonly known as Hagen's pit viper and Hagen's green pit viper, is a species of venomous snake in the subfamily Crotalinae of the family Viperidae. The species is native to Southeast Asia. There are no subspecies that are recognized as being valid.

== Etymology ==
The specific name, hageni, is in honor of German naturalist Dr. Bernhard Hagen, who collected mammals, birds, reptiles, and insects in the eastern part of Sumatra.

== Description ==
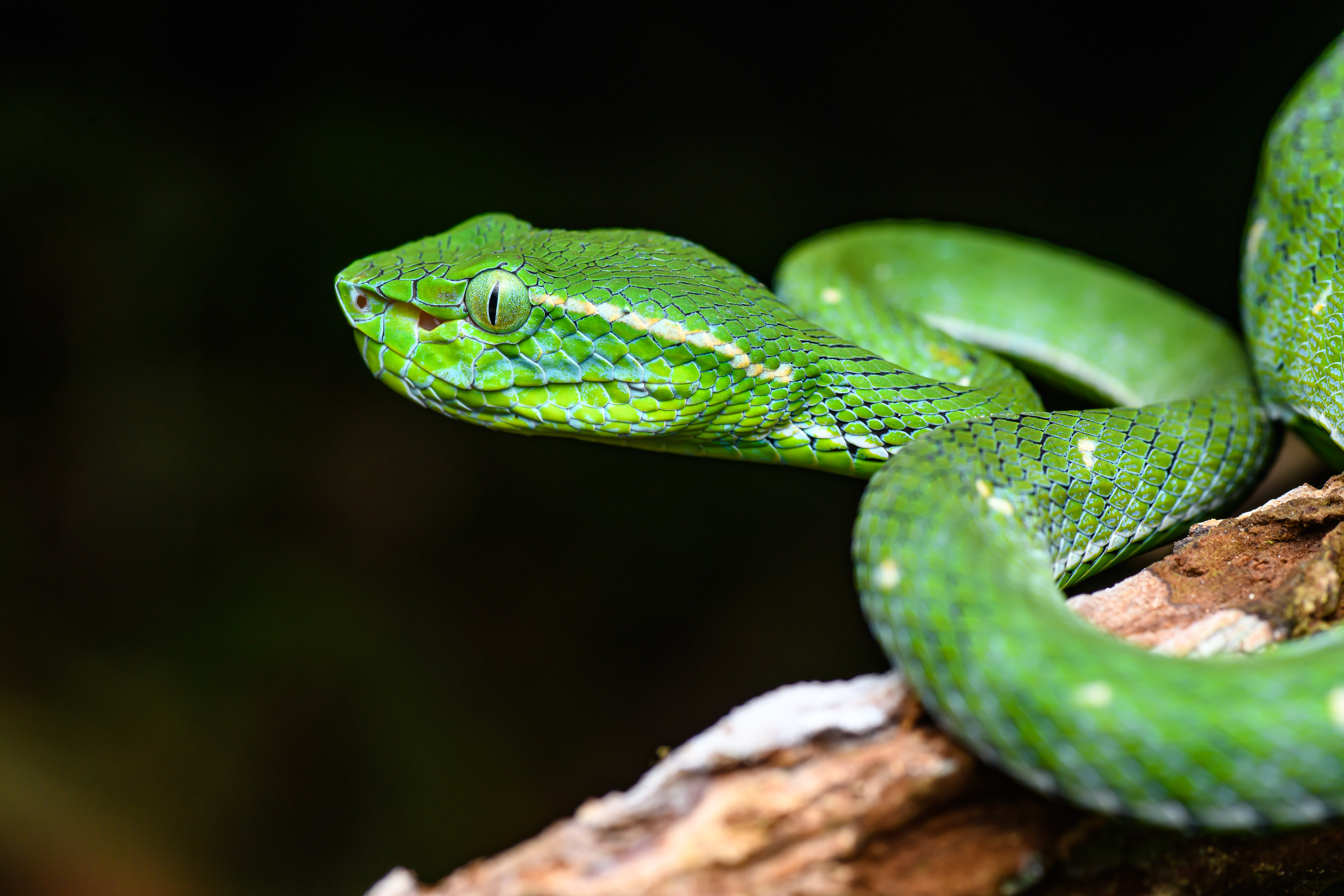
Specimen in Bang Lang National Park

Scalation of T. hageni includes 21 rows of dorsal scales at midbody, 176–198 ventral scales, 63–89 subcaudal scales, and 9–12 supralabial scales. The lectotype has a total length (including tail) of 97 cm (38 in).

== Geographic range ==
T. hageni is found in Peninsular Thailand, Peninsular Malaysia, East Malaysia (Borneo), and Indonesia (Sumatra and the nearby islands of Bangka, Simalur, Nias, Batu, and the Mentawai Islands).

The type locality given is "Sumatra ... [and] island of Banka". Brongersma (1933) emended this to "Deli, Sumatra".

== Habitat ==
The preferred natural habitat of T. hageni is forest, at altitudes of 100–300 m (330–980 ft).

== Behavior ==
T. hageni is arboreal and nocturnal.

== Diet ==
T. hageni preys upon amphibians and lizards.

== Reproduction ==
T. hageni is oviparous.
