= Trimeresurus labialis =

Conservation status
- Critically Endangered (IUCN 3.1)

Scientific classification
- Kingdom: Animalia
- Phylum: Chordata
- Class: Reptilia
- Order: Squamata
- Suborder: Serpentes
- Family: Viperidae
- Genus: Trimeresurus
- Species: T. labialis

Binomial name
- Trimeresurus labialis Steindachner, 1867

Synonyms
- Bothrophis labialis Fitzinger, 1861 (nomen nudum); Trimeresurus labialis Steindachner, 1867; Trim[eresurus]. mutabilis Stoliczka, 1870; Trimeresurus labialis — M.A. Smith, 1943; Cryptelytrops labialis — Malhotra & Thorpe, 2004; Trimeresurus (Trimeresurus) labialis — David et al., 2011

Species of snake

Trimeresurus labialis, commonly called Nicobar bamboo pit viper, is a venomous pit viper species endemic to the Nicobar Islands of India. No subspecies are currently recognized. Based on IUCN assessment in 2021, this viper is classified as critically endangered.

== Geographic range ==
Found only in the Nicobar Islands of India. The type locality given is "den Nikobaren".

== Description ==
Males may attain a total length of 42 cm (17 in), with a tail 8 cm (3.1 in) long; females, total length 44 cm (17 in), tail 7 cm (2.8 in).

Dorsally, T. labialis is brown, either light or dark, with or without darker spots or transverse bars. It may have a light streak on each side of the head, beginning at the snout, continuing under the eye, to the neck. Ventrally, it is also brown.

The dorsal scales are smooth, and are usually in 23 rows at midbody. Ventrals: 158-170 in males; 154-174 in females. Subcaudals: 60-65 in males; 46-57 in females. The subcaudals are usually double, but there may be some interspersed singles.
