= Trimeresurus cantori =

Conservation status
- Endangered (IUCN 3.1)

Scientific classification
- Kingdom: Animalia
- Phylum: Chordata
- Class: Reptilia
- Order: Squamata
- Suborder: Serpentes
- Family: Viperidae
- Genus: Trimeresurus
- Species: T. cantori

Binomial name
- Trimeresurus cantori (Blyth, 1846)

Synonyms
- Trigonocephalus Cantori Blyth, 1846; Trimesurus viridis var. Cantori — Blyth, 1861; Trim[eresurus]. Cantori — Stoliczka, 1870; Trimeresurus Cantoris Stoliczka, 1870; Lachesis cantoris — Boulenger, 1896; Trimeresurus cantori — M.A. Smith, 1943; Cryptelytrops cantori — Malhotra & Thorpe, 2004; Trimeresurus (Trimeresurus) cantori — David et al., 2011

Species of snake

Trimeresurus cantori, also commonly known as Cantor's pit viper or Cantor's pitviper, is a species of venomous pit viper in the subfamily Crotalinae of the family Viperidae. The species is native to the Nicobar Islands and possibly the Andaman Islands of the eastern Indian Ocean. It was named after Theodore Edward Cantor (1809–1860), a Danish naturalist serving as a surgeon with the East India Company in Calcutta. No subspecies are recognized as being valid.

== Geographic range ==
Trimeresurus cantori is found in the Nicobar Islands (which are in the Bay of Bengal), India, and possibly in the Andaman Islands. The type locality given is "Nicobars".

== Description ==
Adults of Trimeresurus cantori may attain a snout-to-vent length (SVL) of 115 cm (45 in). Boulenger reported that an adult female with a total length (tail included) of 102 cm (40 in) had a tail 14 cm (5.5 in) long.

This species varies in pattern and color. Dorsally, it may be green, dark brown, or light brown. Green individuals may have yellow spots, and brown specimens may have darker spots. Running along each side of the head, below the eye and above the upper lip, is a cream-colored stripe. There is also a cream-colored stripe on the first row of dorsal scales on each side of the body. Ventrally, it is greenish or cream-colored, with some brown spots on the underside of the tail.

The weakly keeled dorsal scales are arranged in 27–31 rows at midbody. The ventrals number 174–184. The anal plate is entire, and the subcaudals, which are divided (paired), number 55–76.

== Habitat ==
The preferred natural habitat of Trimeresurus cantori is forest, at altitudes from sea level to 200 m (660 ft), but it has also been found in coconut plantations and rural gardens.

== Behavior ==
Trimeresurus cantori is nocturnal and will hunt near houses.

== Diet ==
Trimeresurus cantori preys upon small mammals and birds.

== Venom ==
The species Trimeresurus cantori possesses a potent venom, and some of its bites to humans have resulted in fatalities.

== Reproduction ==
Trimeresurus cantori is viviparous.
