= Trimeresurus mcgregori =

- Captive-bred adult female

Conservation status
- Endangered (IUCN 3.1)

Scientific classification
- Kingdom: Animalia
- Phylum: Chordata
- Class: Reptilia
- Order: Squamata
- Suborder: Serpentes
- Family: Viperidae
- Genus: Trimeresurus
- Species: T. mcgregori

Binomial name
- Trimeresurus mcgregori Taylor, 1919
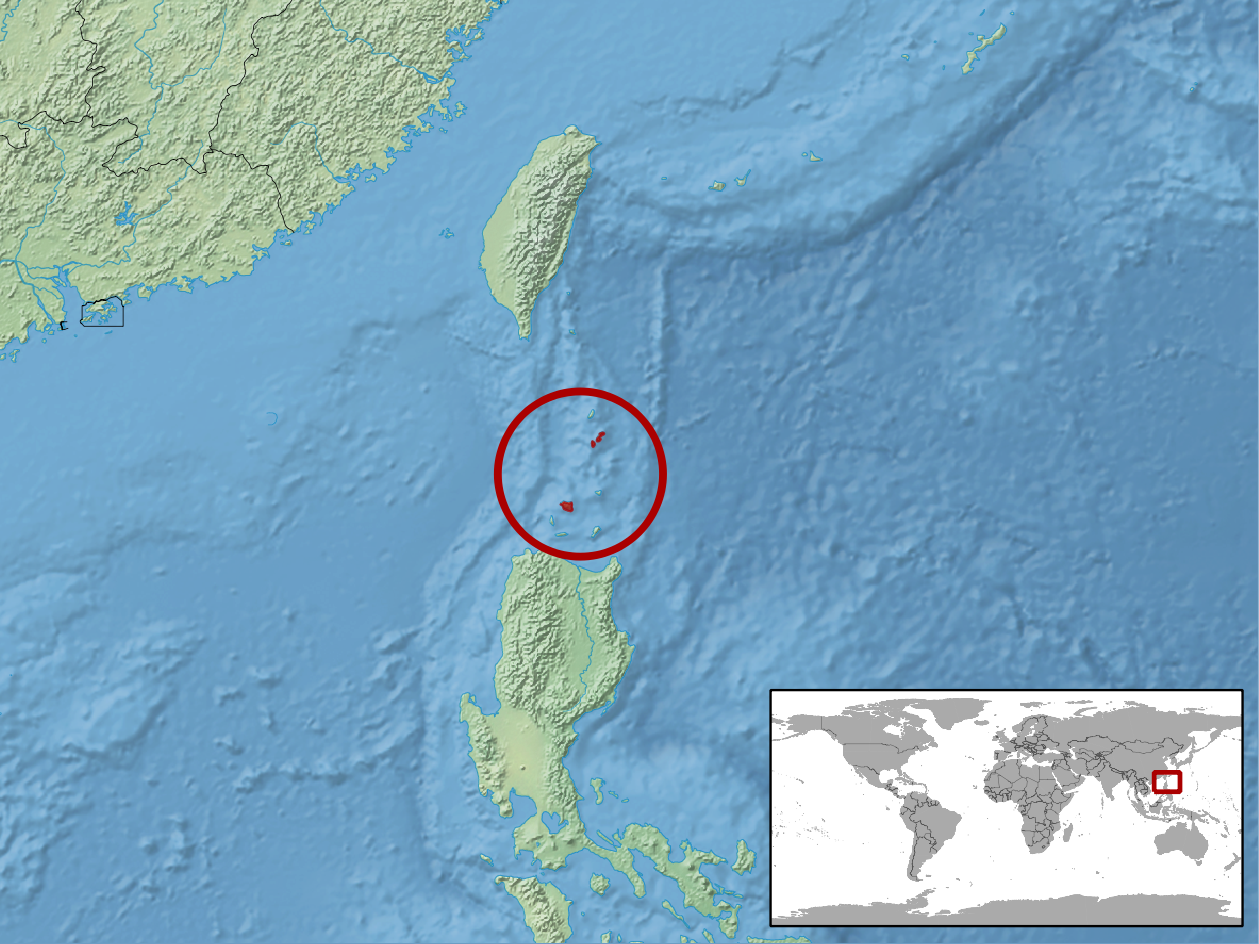

Synonyms
- Trimeresurus mcgregori Taylor, 1919; Trimeresurus flavomaculatus mcgregori — Leviton, 1961; Trimeresurus mcgregori — Gumprecht, 2001; Parias flavomaculatus mcgregori — Malhotra & Thorpe, 2004; Trimeresurus mcgregori — Mattison, 2007; Parias mcgregori — Orlov et al., 2009; Trimeresurus (Parias) mcgregori — David et al., 2011

Species of snake

Trimeresurus mcgregori, commonly known as McGregor's pit viper or the Batanes pit viper, is a species of venomous snake in the subfamily Crotalinae of the family Viperidae. The species is endemic to the Philippines.

== Etymology ==
The specific name, mcgregori, is in honor of Australian-American ornithologist Richard Crittenden McGregor (1871–1936), who collected the type specimen, and survived its bite.

== Description ==
The scalation of Trimeresurus mcgregori includes 21 (23) rows of dorsal scales at midbody, 170-172/173-178 (or 169-172/168-178) ventral scales in males/females, 62-66/58-60 (or 63-69/56-62) subcaudal scales in males/females, and 10–11 supralabial scales.

== Geographic range ==
Trimeresurus mcgregori is found in the Philippines on the Batanes Islands. The type locality given is "Batan Island, Batanes Group, (lying between Luzon and Formosa)" (Philippine Islands).

== Habitat ==
The preferred natural habitats of Trimeresurus mcgregori are forest and shrubland, at altitudes from sea level to 800 m (2,600 ft), but it has also been found in agricultural areas.

== Taxonomy ==
Trimeresurus mcgregori was originally described as a new species by E.H. Taylor in 1919. It was considered to be a subspecies of T. flavomaculatus by Alan E. Leviton (1961). It was re-elevated to a full species by Andreas Gumprecht (2001, 2002).
