= Trimeresurus mutabilis =

Scientific classification
- Kingdom: Animalia
- Phylum: Chordata
- Class: Reptilia
- Order: Squamata
- Suborder: Serpentes
- Family: Viperidae
- Genus: Trimeresurus
- Species: T. mutabilis

Binomial name
- Trimeresurus mutabilis Stoliczka, 1870

Species of snake

Trimeresurus mutabilis is a venomous pitviper species endemic to Central Nicobar Island. Its common name is Central Nicobar pit viper or Central Nicobar bamboo pit viper.
