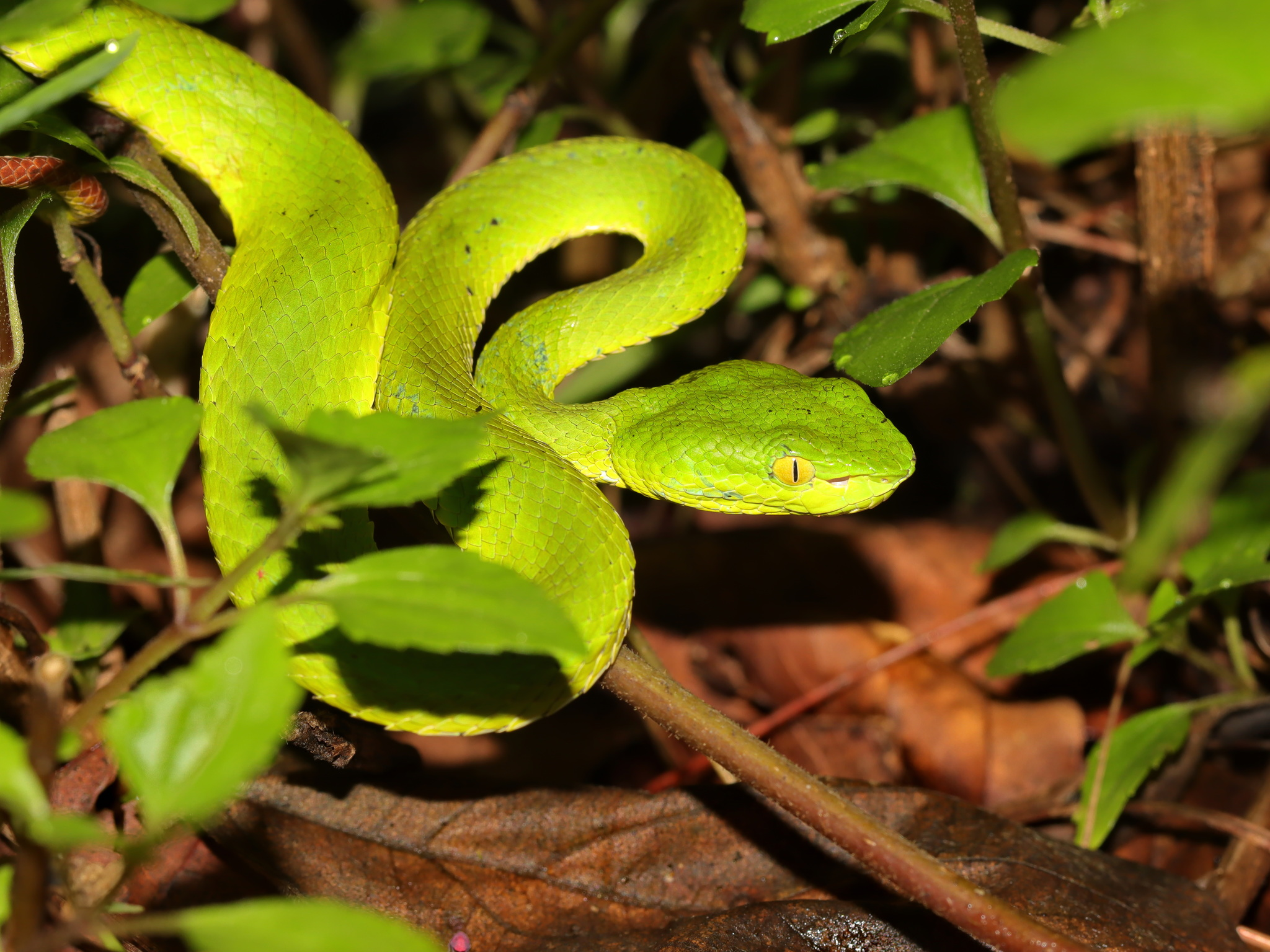
- Trimeresurus yunnanensis

Conservation status
- Least Concern (IUCN 3.1)

Scientific classification
- Kingdom: Animalia
- Phylum: Chordata
- Class: Reptilia
- Order: Squamata
- Suborder: Serpentes
- Family: Viperidae
- Genus: Trimeresurus
- Species: T. yunnanensis

Binomial name
- Trimeresurus yunnanensis Schmidt, 1925

Synonyms
- Trimeresurus yunnanensis Schmidt, 1925; Trimeresurus gramineus yunnanensis – Stejneger, 1927; Trimeresurus stejnegeri yunnanensis – Pope, 1935; Trimeresurus yunnanensis – Zhao, 1995; Viridovipera yunnanensis – Malhotra & Thorpe, 2004; Trimeresurus (Viridovipera) yunnanensis – David et al., 2011

= Trimeresurus yunnanensis =

Species of snake

Trimeresurus yunnanensis, commonly known as the Yunnan bamboo pitviper, is a venomous pitviper species endemic to China.

== Description ==
The scalation includes 19 (or 21) rows of dorsal scales at midbody, 154-164/150-172 ventral scales in males/females, 61-71/52-65 subcaudal scales in males/females, and 9-11 supralabial scales.

== Geographic range ==
It is found in southern China (Yunnan and southwestern Sichuan). The type locality given is "Tengyueh, Yunnan Province, China" (= Tengchong County).

== Taxonomy ==
Zhao (1995) raised this taxon back up to the level of a full species: T. yunnanensis.
