= Trimeresurus davidi =

Scientific classification
- Kingdom: Animalia
- Phylum: Chordata
- Class: Reptilia
- Order: Squamata
- Suborder: Serpentes
- Family: Viperidae
- Genus: Trimeresurus
- Species: T. davidi

Binomial name
- Trimeresurus davidi Chandramouli, Campbell & Vogel, 2020

Species of snake

Trimeresurus davidi is a species of pit viper recently described from the Car Nicobar Island of the Nicobar Archipelago, Indian Ocean. The specific epithet (davidi) honours herpetologist Patrick David, who made significant contribution to the taxonomy of Asian pit vipers, and herpetofauna of the Nicobar island in particular.

== Description ==
Trimeresurus davidi is a medium to large-sized pit viper, with body lengths ranging from 277 to 835 mm. Key distinguishing features include:

Dorsal scales arranged in 21–25 rows at the midbody. A partially fused nasal and first supralabial scale. 166–179 ventral scales and 58–70 subcaudal scales. A single preocular scale and 2–3 postocular scales. 10–12 supralabial and 12–15 infralabial scales. Two internasal scales, typically in contact with each other. 11–14 cephalic scales.

The species exhibits a striking verdant green coloration on both its dorsal and ventral sides, lacking the white ventrolateral stripes seen in some related species. Males feature a distinctive white supralabial streak, bordered by a reddish hue above. Both sexes display a pair of white and red stripes along the sides of the tail, which is reddish-brown in color. The eyes are characterized by a greenish iris

== Distribution and habitat ==
Trimeresurus davidi is endemic to Car Nicobar Island, part of the Nicobar Archipelago in the Indian Ocean. This restricted range makes the species particularly vulnerable to environmental changes and habitat loss. The viper is arboreal, meaning it primarily inhabits trees, which is typical of many species within the Trimeresurus genus.
