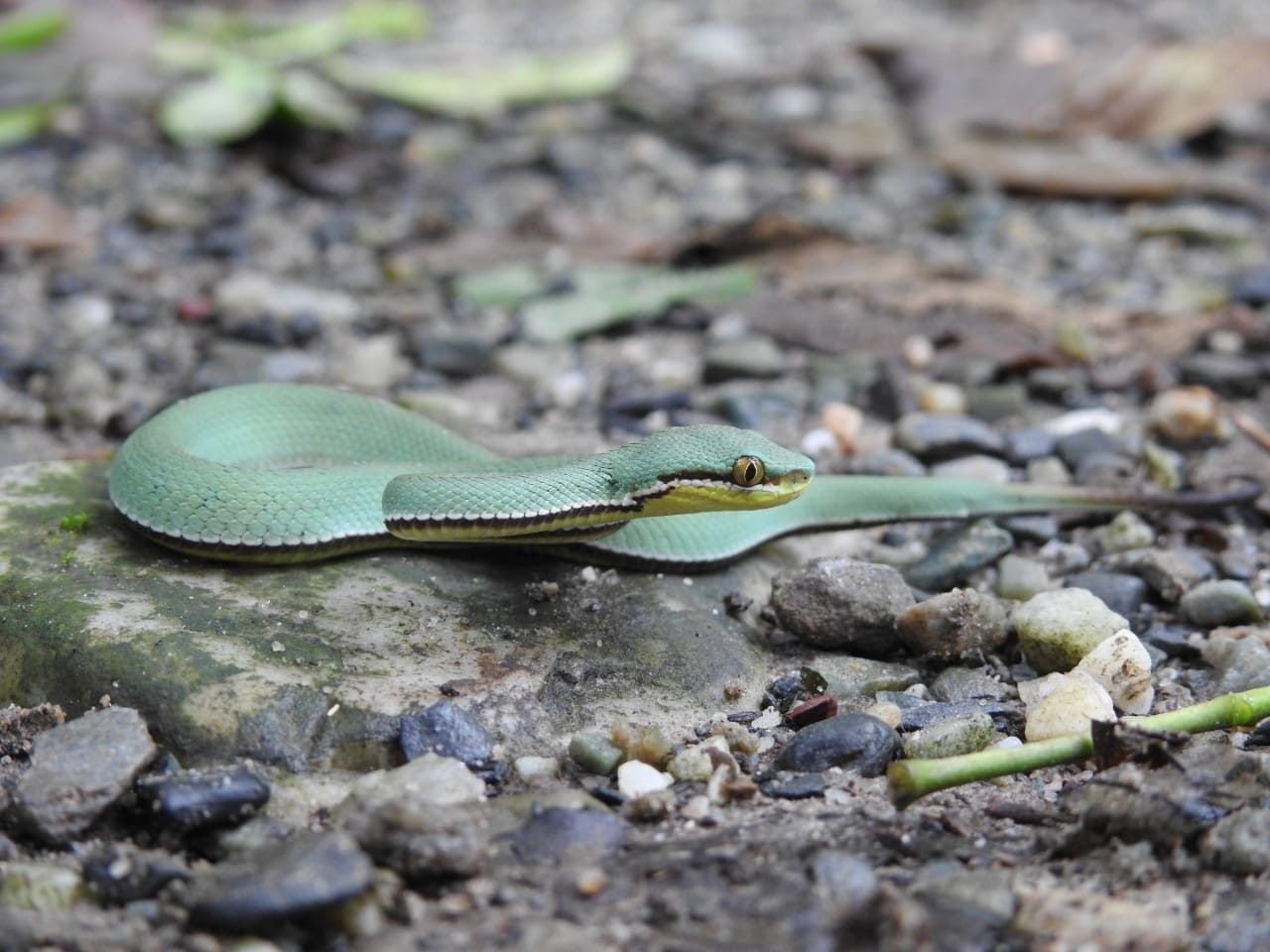
- Male from Buxa Tiger Reserve, West Bengal, India

Scientific classification
- Kingdom: Animalia
- Phylum: Chordata
- Class: Reptilia
- Order: Squamata
- Suborder: Serpentes
- Family: Viperidae
- Genus: Trimeresurus
- Species: T. mayaae

Binomial name
- Trimeresurus mayaae Rathee, Purkayastha, Lalremsanga, Dalal, Biakzuala, Muansanga & Mirza, 2022

= Trimeresurus mayaae =

Species of snake

Trimeresurus mayaae also commonly known as Maya's pit viper is a species of venomous pit viper endemic to north-eastern India.

== Description ==
Males have a deep green dorsum, and fluorescent green ventrum with black interstitial skin. The head is dark green with cyan borders on scales, eyes are rust colored and red-white stripes on the body. Female individuals are similar but with yellowish-green ventrum and green eyes. Both sexes exhibit rusty red tails.

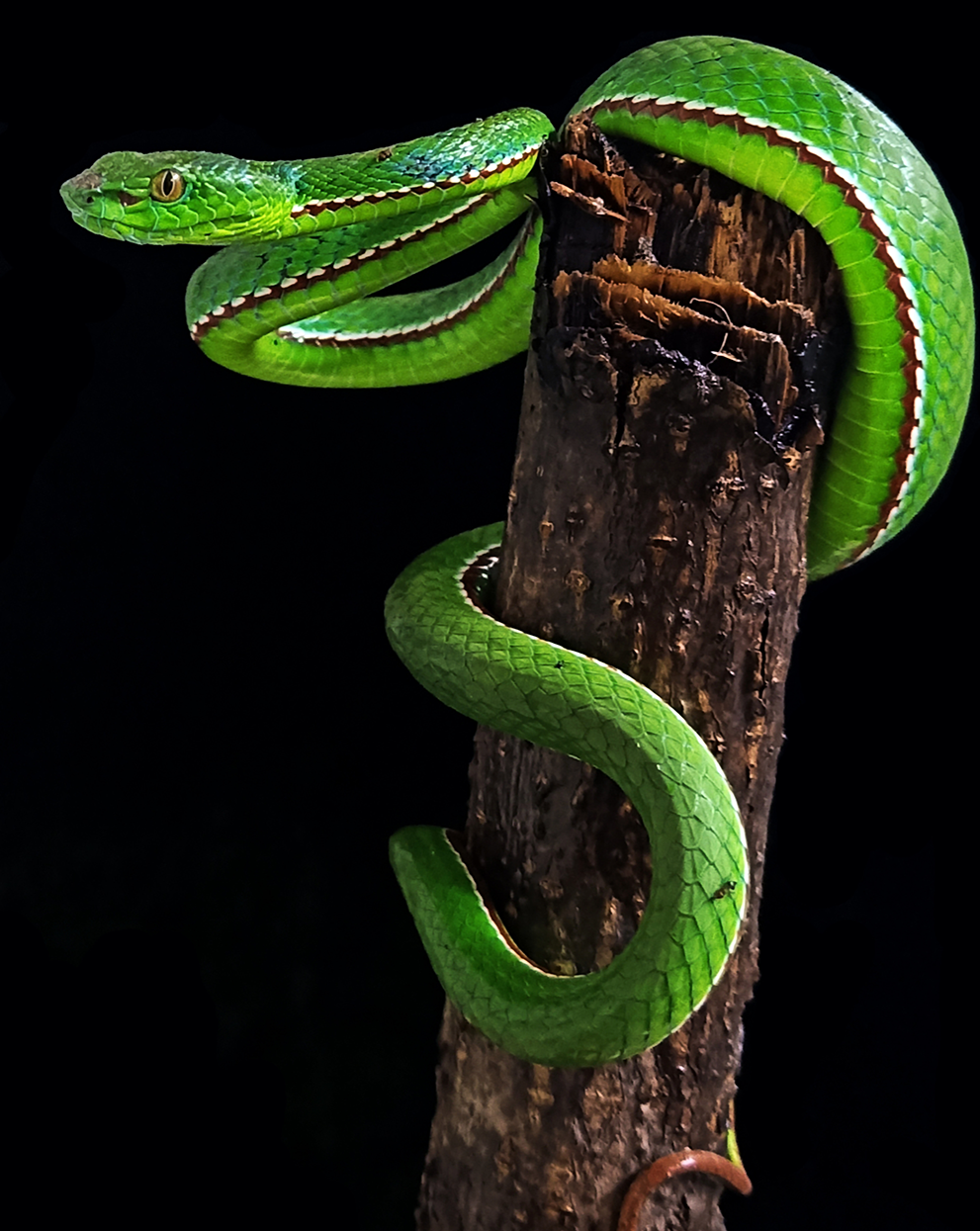
Male from Mizoram, India.

== Range ==
Trimeresurus mayaae occurs throughout the Shillong Plateau and the adjoining Jaintia hills, Barail and Mizo hills. It has also been found in Manipur.

== Habitat and ecology ==
Specimens were found during early hours of night in a forested patch next to a stream within Military Cantonment area. An individual was spotted on the ground, crossing a track. In captivity, the specimens fed on the Rhacophorus bipunctatus, Leptobrachium sp. and Minervarya sp.

All known records of the species are from elevations greater tha 900m and hence, the low land areas may potentially act as a biogeographic barrier for the new species. The distributed areas are isolated from other members of Viridovipera (Subgenus of Trimeresurus), by low elevation human dominated landscape, The Brahmaputra River to its north and the Indo-Burma hills along the international borders of the two countries (India and Myanmar).

== Etymology ==
The specific epithet mayaae is derived from the name of one of the species discoverer's late mother, Maya Singh Rathee.

== Taxonomy ==
Trimeresurus mayaae is likely a member of the subgenus Viridovipera as suggested by molecular data. Molecular data also suggests that the species is sister to T. medoensis.
