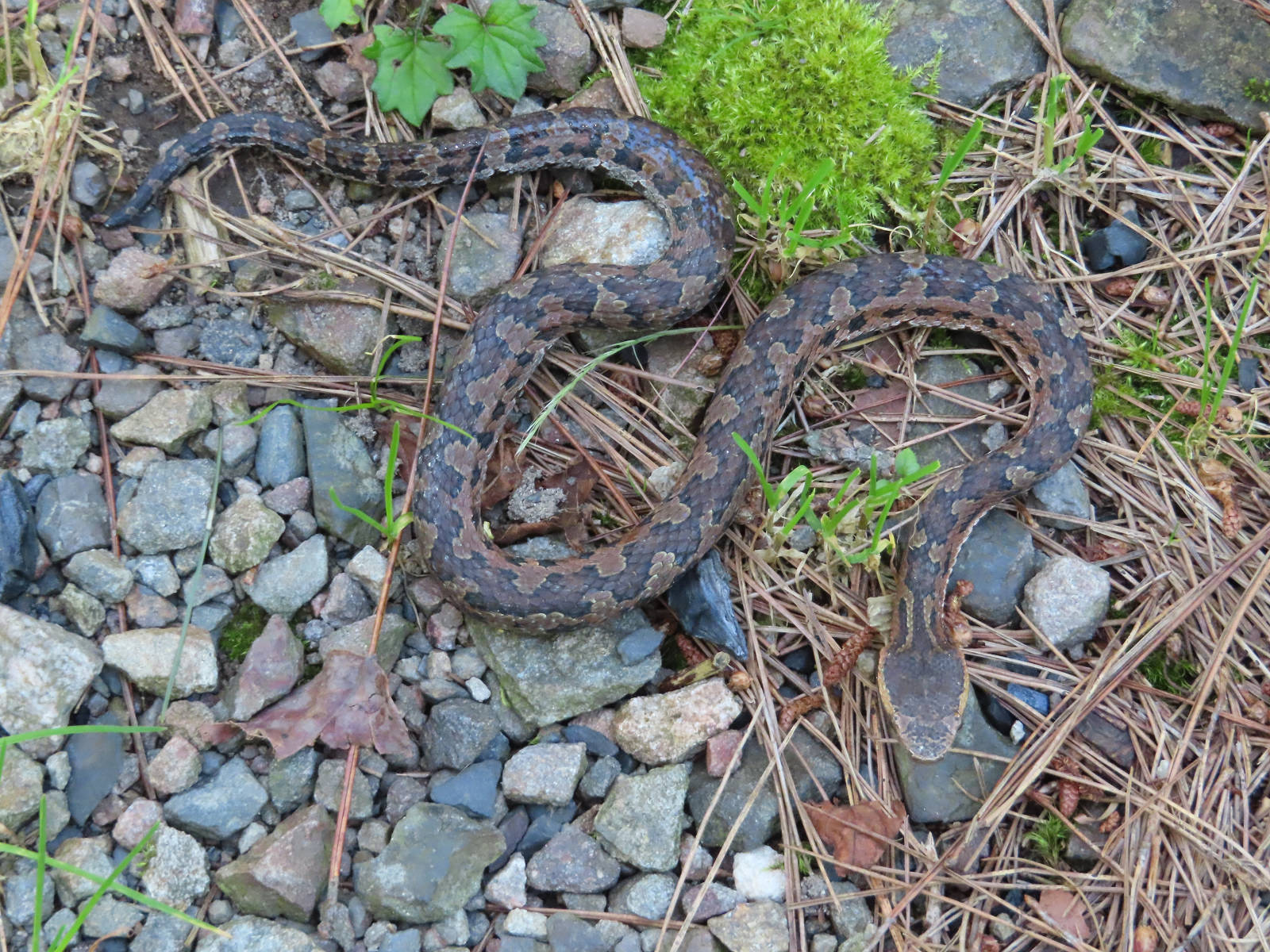

Conservation status
- Least Concern (IUCN 3.1)

Scientific classification
- Kingdom: Animalia
- Phylum: Chordata
- Class: Reptilia
- Order: Squamata
- Suborder: Serpentes
- Family: Viperidae
- Genus: Trimeresurus
- Species: T. gracilis

Binomial name
- Trimeresurus gracilis Ōshima, 1920

Synonyms
- Oxyus gracilis (Oshima, 1920); Ovophis gracilis (Oshima, 1920)

= Trimeresurus gracilis =

Species of snake

Trimeresurus gracilis, commonly known as the Taiwan pit viper or Taiwan mountain pitviper, is a venomous pit viper species endemic to Taiwan. No subspecies are currently recognized. The species is known as kikushi habu in Japanese.

== Taxonomy ==
Trimeresurus gracilis was first formally described in 1920 by the Japanese herpetologist and ichthyologist Masamitsu Ōshima with its type locality given as Mt. Noko, Central Formosa. This is Mount Nengkaoshan in Nantou County, Taiwan. Although generally placed in the genus Trimeresurus some studies have recovered this species as the sister species of Ovophis okinavensis and may belong to a genus other than Trimeresurus, suggesting both species me be better placed in the genus Gloydius. Other studies place Ovophis within Trimeresurus, albeit rather provisionally pending further work and that the genus Trimeresurus dispersed into the Ryukyu region at least three times, and that T. flavoviridis and T. tularensis from the central Ryukyus are "relict taxa" which used to be more widespread and diverse in the past in surrounding regions.. T, gracilis is a pit viper belonging to the subfamily Crotalinae in the viper family Viperidae.

== Description ==
Trimeresurus gracilis is a small snake with a total length up to 60 cm (24 in). Scalation includes 19 (or 21) rows of dorsal scales at midbody, 144–149 ventral scales, 43–53 subcaudal scales, and 7–8 supralabial scales. This species has an obvious angular ridge running from the upper orbit to the tip of the nose, and a distinct pit between the eye and the nostril. The Eye is internediate in size and is place high on the head,creating a small bulge. The iris is pale brown to tan speckled with darker coloured spots and this merges with the color of the head, and there can be a indistinct longitudinal brown to brownish-black band across the centre of the eye, which lines up with a dark brown band to the rear of the eye. The pupil is vertically elliptical, black, with an indistinct thin white edgen. The tongue is dark gray to black, with the stem being paler than the fork tips. It has large mobile fangs that areprotected within a sheath in the front of the upper jaw. The dorsal part of the head is brown to dark brown, with darker brown patterns of varying shades, a dark band edged with whitish or paler brown stripes runs from the eye to the corner of mouth. The sides of head are whitish to tan, or white and with black blotches. The dorsal part of the body is pale brown to reddish-brown with patterned with markings varying in color from chocolate to brownish-black with a mid-dorsal series of dark blotches, and a similar parallel line on the flanks. These blotches may have thin whitish margins. Some specimens may show small white spots on the tail. The lower part of the head is whitish to tan and may show a variable amount of black markings. The lower body is similarly colored but becomes gradually darker toward the tail and is has diffuse black to red brown spots, which can create a checkerboard pattern or form moderately wide irregular horizontal lines along the flanks.

== Distribution and habitat ==
Trimeresurus gracilis is endemic to Taiwan where it is found in the understorey of forests, or in umbrella bamboos, grasslands, close to streams, or in the vicinity of paths in middle and high altitude mountains at altitudes greater than 2,000 m (6,600 ft).

== Biology ==
Trimeresurus gracilis are predators with the juveniles feeding largely on lizards, with a few amphibians, as juvenile but larger snakes feed on mammals, males mostly on shrews and females mostly on mice. This snake is ovoviviparous and gives birth to between 3 and 8 young in the autumn.

== Human interaction ==
Trimeresurus gracilis has been known to bite people on two occasions, there is no avialable antivenom so the patients were treated with antivenom from other pit vipers but required higher doses and surgery. One patient ended up with permanent disfigurement around the bite site.
