= Trimeresurus phuketensis =

Scientific classification
- Kingdom: Animalia
- Phylum: Chordata
- Class: Reptilia
- Order: Squamata
- Suborder: Serpentes
- Family: Viperidae
- Genus: Trimeresurus
- Species: T. phuketensis

Binomial name
- Trimeresurus phuketensis Sumontha, Kunya, Pauwels, Nitikul and Punnadee, 2011

Species of snake

Trimeresurus phuketensis (also known as the Phuket pit viper) is a species of pit viper found on Phuket Island in Thailand.
