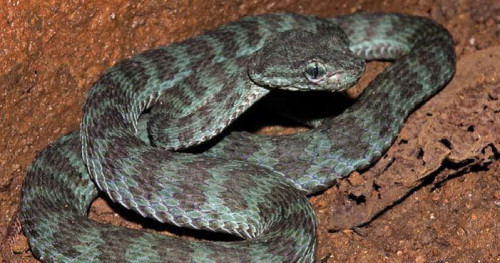

Conservation status
- Endangered (IUCN 3.1)

Scientific classification
- Kingdom: Animalia
- Phylum: Chordata
- Class: Reptilia
- Order: Squamata
- Suborder: Serpentes
- Family: Viperidae
- Genus: Trimeresurus
- Species: T. truongsonensis

Binomial name
- Trimeresurus truongsonensis Orlov, Ryabov, Thanh & H. Cuc, 2004

Synonyms
- Viridovipera truongsonensis (Orlov, Ryabov, Thanh & H. Cuc, 2004)

= Trimeresurus truongsonensis =

Species of snake

Trimeresurus truongsonensis is a venomous pitviper species endemic to Vietnam. Its common names are Truong Son pit viper and Quang Binh pitviper.

== Geographic range ==
This species is known with certainty only from the Phong Nha-Ke Bang National Park, Quang Binh province, in the Annamite Mountains of central Vietnam.

== Habitat ==
This species is found in evergreen tropical forests at elevations of 500–600 m (1,600–2,000 ft) above sea level. These secretive snakes are mostly seen when basking following strong rains.

== Reproduction ==
Trimeresurus truongsonensis is viviparous.
