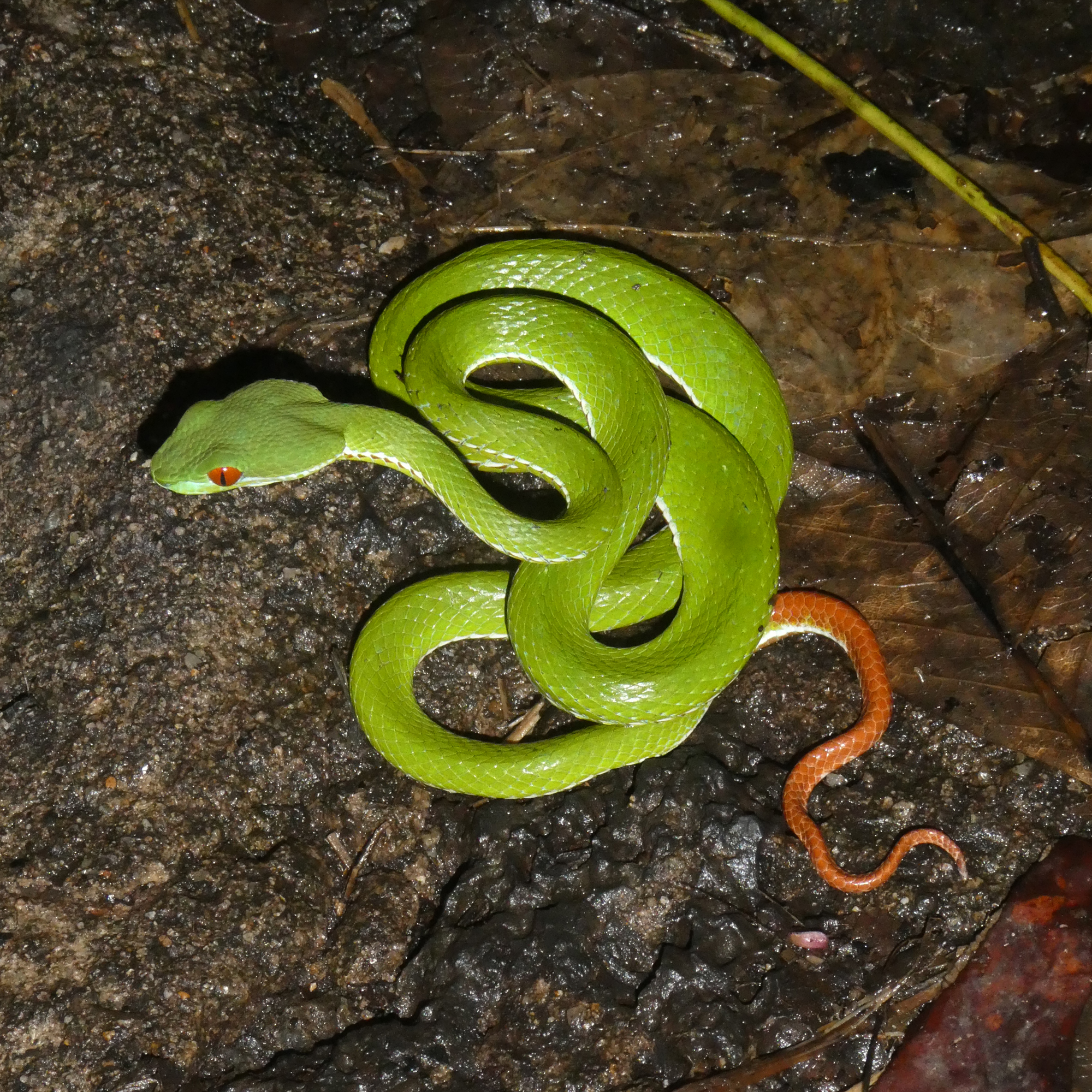
- T. rubeus juvenile in Cat Tien National Park

Conservation status
- Vulnerable (IUCN 3.1)

Scientific classification
- Kingdom: Animalia
- Phylum: Chordata
- Class: Reptilia
- Order: Squamata
- Suborder: Serpentes
- Family: Viperidae
- Genus: Trimeresurus
- Species: T. rubeus

Binomial name
- Trimeresurus rubeus (Malhotra, Thorpe, Mrinalini, and Stuart, 2011)

Synonyms
- Cryptelytrops rubeus Malhotra, Thorpe, Mrinalini, and Stuart, 2011; Trimeresurus rubeus (Malhotra et al., 2011)

= Trimeresurus rubeus =

Species of snake

Trimeresurus rubeus, commonly known as the ruby-eyed green pitviper, is a venomous pit viper species endemic to Southeast Asia. It occurs in southern Vietnam and eastern Cambodia. No subspecies are currently recognized.

Trimeresurus rubeus inhabits seasonal tropical forests, including lightly disturbed ones. All specimens have been recorded at night in dense vegetation, often near fast-flowing streams. It is known from elevations below 500 m (1,600 ft) above sea level. Although most known populations occur in national parks, it can be threatened by habitat loss and harvesting for food and snake wine.
