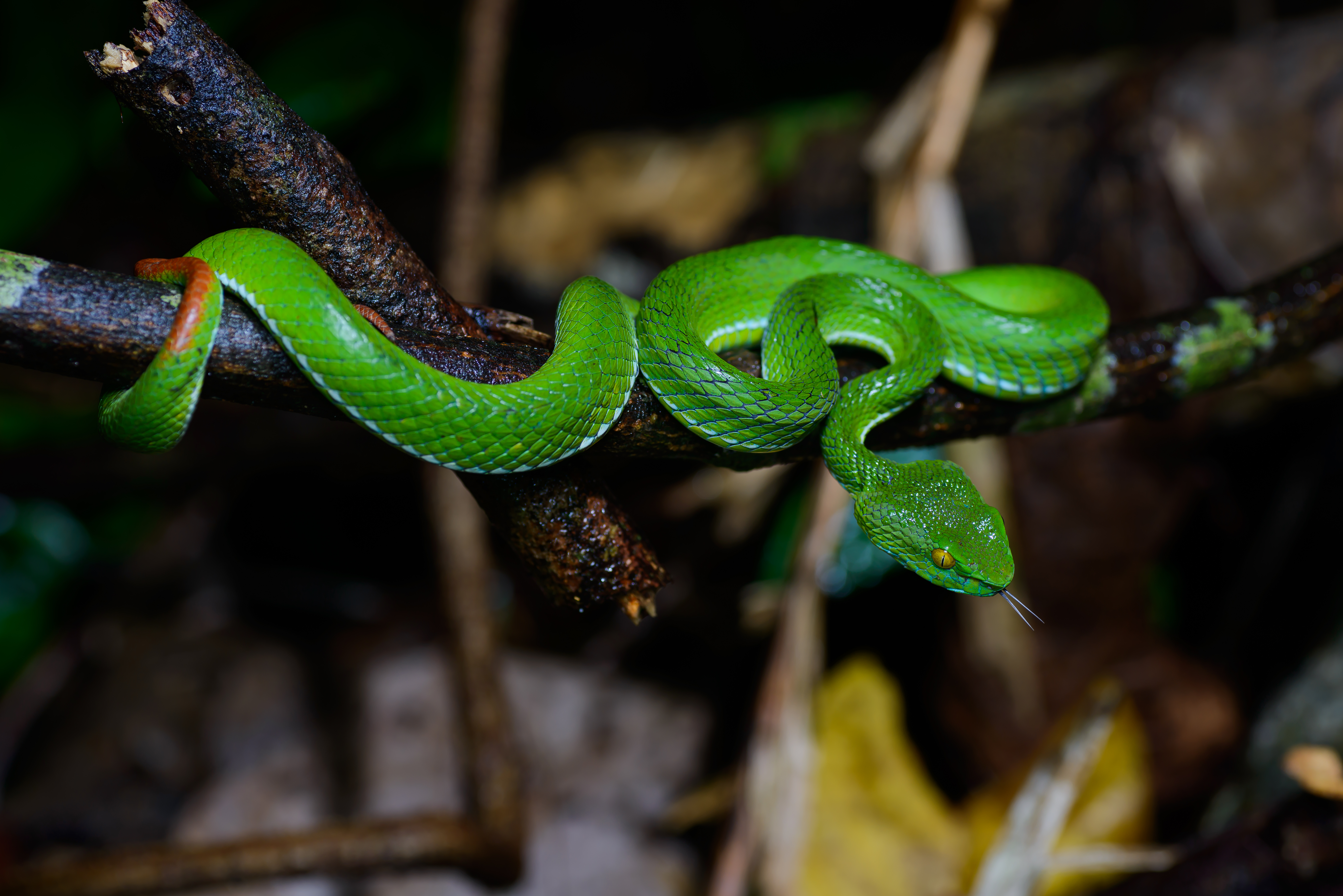

Scientific classification
- Kingdom: Animalia
- Phylum: Chordata
- Class: Reptilia
- Order: Squamata
- Suborder: Serpentes
- Family: Viperidae
- Genus: Trimeresurus
- Species: T. cardamomensis

Binomial name
- Trimeresurus cardamomensis (Malhotra, Thorpe, Mrinalini and Stuart, 2011)

= Trimeresurus cardamomensis =

Species of snake

Trimeresurus cardamomensis is a venomous pit viper species located in eastern Thailand and the Koh Kong Province in Cambodia. It is more commonly known as the Cardamom Mountains green pit viper.
