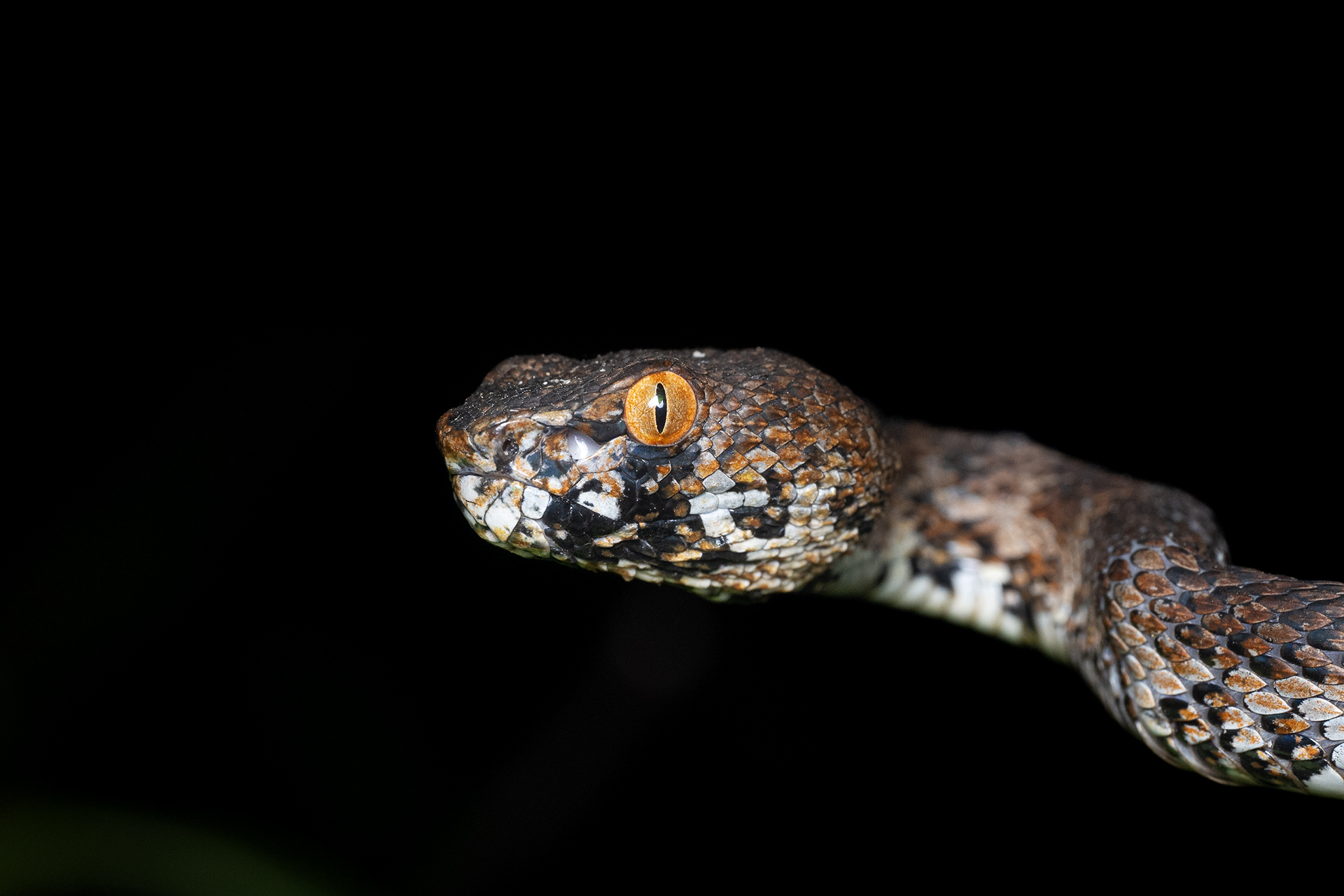

Scientific classification
- Kingdom: Animalia
- Phylum: Chordata
- Class: Reptilia
- Order: Squamata
- Suborder: Serpentes
- Family: Viperidae
- Genus: Trimeresurus
- Species: T. andersonii

Binomial name
- Trimeresurus andersonii Theobald, 1868

Synonyms
- T[rimeresurus]. Andersoni Theobald, 1868; T[rimeresurus]. obscurus Theobald, 1868; Crotalus Trimeres[urus]. Andersonii — Higgins, 1873; Trimeresurus andersonii — Boulenger, 1890; Trimeresurus acutimentalis F. Werner, 1926; Trimeresurus purpureomaculatus andersoni — M.A. Smith, 1943; Trimeresurus andersonii — Gumprecht et al., 2004; Cryptelytrops andersonii — Malhotra & Thorpe, 2004; Trimeresurus (Trimeresurus) andersonii — David et al., 2011

= Trimeresurus andersonii =

Species of snake

Trimeresurus andersonii is a venomous pitviper species endemic to the Andaman Islands of India. Common names include: Nicobar mangrove pit viper, Anderson's pitviper, and Andaman pit viper.

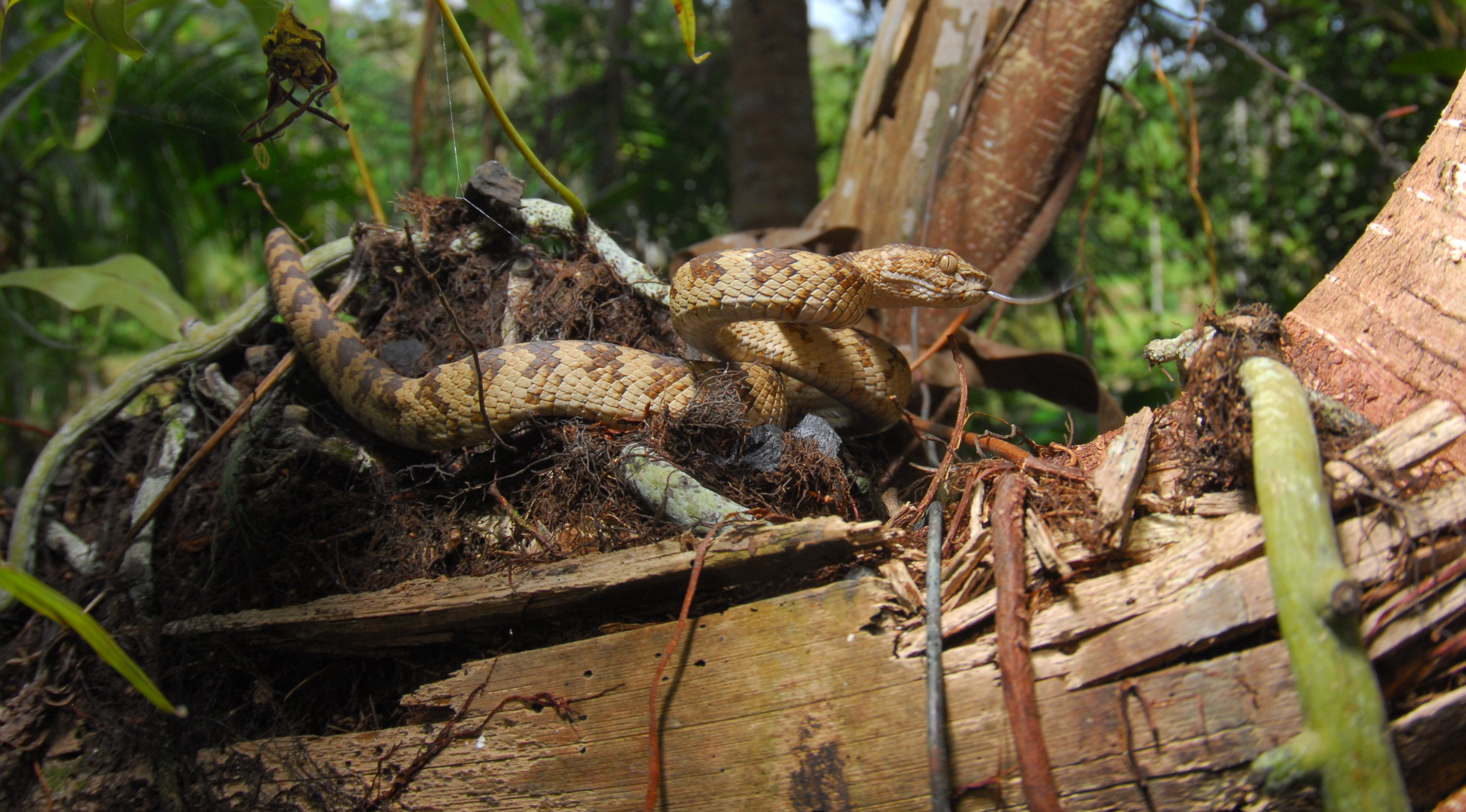
Pitviper

== Etymology ==
The specific name, andersonii, is in honor of Scottish zoologist John Anderson, who worked in India 1864-1886 and was the first curator of the Indian Museum in Calcutta (now called Kolkata).

== Geographic range ==
T. andersonii is found only in the Andaman Islands of India. The type locality given by Theobald (1868) is "No record", which was restricted to "Andaman Islands" by Regenass and Kramer (1981).
