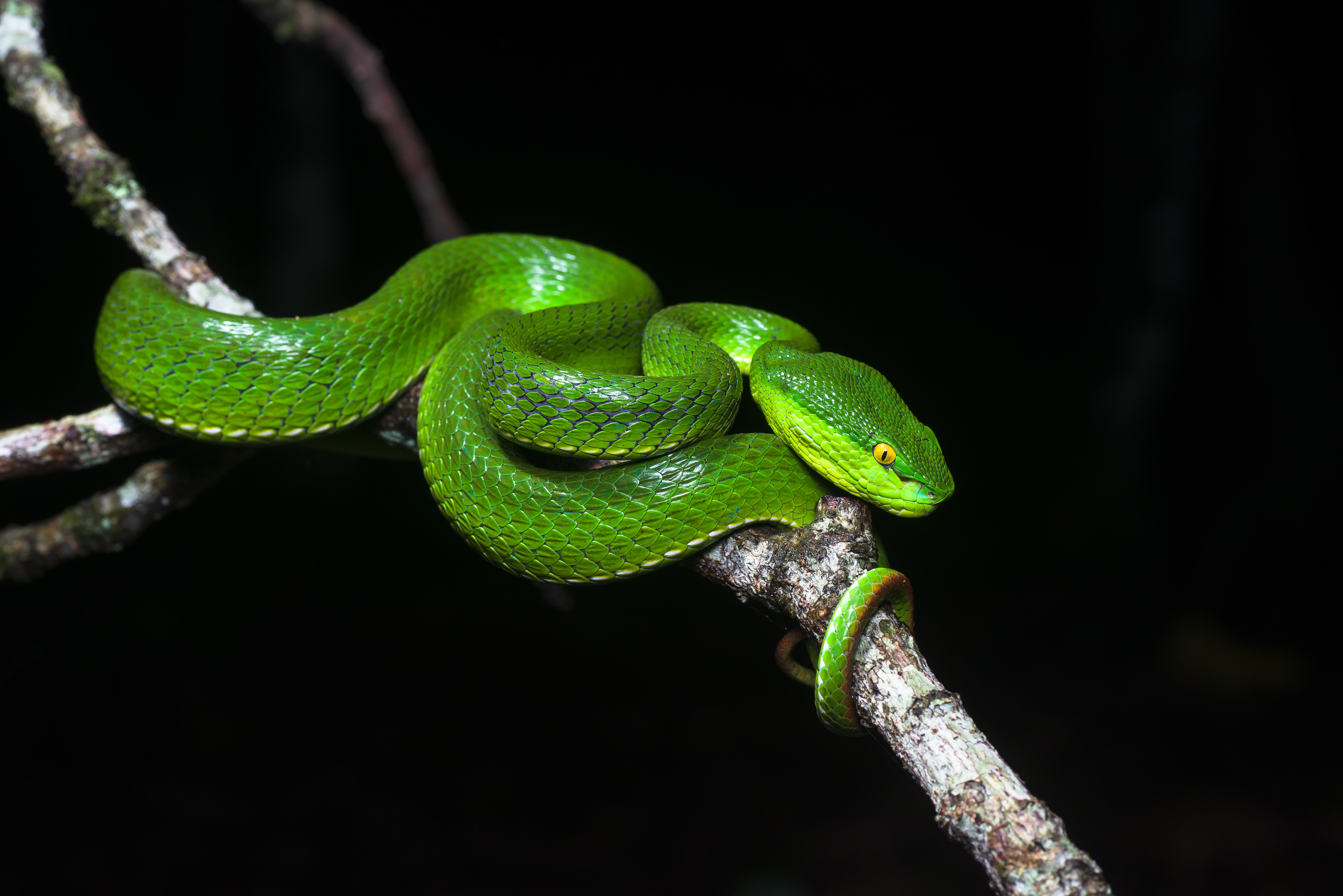
- White-lipped pit viper, T. albolabris

Scientific classification
- Kingdom: Animalia
- Phylum: Chordata
- Class: Reptilia
- Order: Squamata
- Suborder: Serpentes
- Family: Viperidae
- Subfamily: Crotalinae
- Genus: Trimeresurus; Lacépède, 1804

Synonyms
- Trimeresurus Lacepède, 1804; Craspedocephalus Kuhl & van Hasselt, 1822; Trimeresura – Fleming, 1822; Craspedocephalus – Gray, 1825; Megaera Wagler, 1830; Atropos Wagler, 1830; Trimesurus Gray, 1842

= Trimeresurus =

Genus of snakes

Trimeresurus is a genus of pit vipers native to Asia. They are found from the Indian subcontinent throughout Southeast Asia, China, and the Pacific Islands. The genus currently contains 44 recognized species. Common names include Asian palm pit vipers, Asian lanceheads, and green pit vipers.

== Description ==
Most species in the genus Trimeresurus are relatively small, primarily arboreal species, with thin bodies and prehensile tails. Most Trimeresurus species are typically green in color, but some species also have yellow, black, orange, red, or gold markings.

== Feeding ==
The diet of Trimeresurus species includes a variety of animals, including lizards, amphibians, birds, rodents, and other small mammals.

== Reproduction ==
Like most viper species, many of the species in the genus Trimeresurus are ovoviviparous, bearing live young. However, some species such as T. macrolepis and T. hageni are oviparous, laying eggs. Also, the reproductive biology of some Trimeresurus species is as yet unknown.

== Venom ==
Trimeresurus venom varies in toxicity between species, but all are primarily hemotoxic and considered to be medically significant to humans.

== Geographic range ==
Species in the genus Trimeresurus are found in Southeast Asia from India (including regions of the North Chotanagpur division of Jharkhand) to Southern China, Taiwan, and Japan, and the Malay Archipelago to Timor.

== Species ==
Image	Species	Taxon author	Subsp.*	Common name	Geographic range
	T. albolabris	Gray, 1842	0	white-lipped pit viper	India (Assam), Nicobar Islands, Myanmar, Thailand, Cambodia, Laos, Vietnam, Southern China (Fujian, Hainan, Guangxi, Guangdong), Hong Kong, West Malaysia, Indonesia (Sumatra, Borneo, Sulawesi, Java, Madura, Lombok, Sumbawa, Komodo, Flores, Sumba, Rote, Timor, Kisar, Wetar).
	T. andersonii	Theobald, 1868	0	Anderson's pit viper, Andaman pit viper	Andaman Islands, Nicobar Islands.
	T. arunachalensis	Captain, Deepak, Pandit, Bhatt & Athreya, 2019	0	Arunachal pit viper	India: Arunachal Pradesh
	T. ayerwadyensis	Chan, Anuar, Sankar, Law, Law, Shivaram, Christian, Mulcahy & Malhotra, 2023	0	Ayerwady pit viper	Myanmar
	T. calamitas	Vogel, David & Sidik, 2022	0		Indonesia (Nias Island).
	T. cantori	Blyth, 1846	0	Cantor's pit viper	India: Nicobar Islands, and possibly the Andaman Islands.
	T. cardamomensis	Malhotra, Thorpe, Mrinalini & B. Stuart, 2011	0	Cardamom Mountains green pit viper	Eastern Thailand, Koh Kong Province in Cambodia.
	T. caudornatus	Chen, Ding, Vogel & S. Shi, 2020	0	ornamental-tailed pit viper	China (Yunnan).
	T. ciliaris	Idiiatullina, Pawangkhanant, Tawan, Worranuch, Dechochai, Suwannapoom, Nguyen, Chanhome & Poyarkov, 2023	0	limestone eyelash pit viper	Thailand
	T. cryptographicus	Pawangkhanant, Idiiatullina, Ruangsuwan, Matsukoji, David, Suwannapoom & Poyarkov, 2025	0	Cryptic green pit viper	Thailand
	T. Cyanolabris	Idiiatullina, Nguyen, Bragin, Pawangkhanant, Le, Vogel, David & Poyarkov, 2024	0	blue lipped green pit viper	Vietnam
	T. davidi	Chandramouli, P. Campbell & Vogel, 2020.	0		Car Nicobar, India.
	T. erythrochloris	Pawangkhanant, Idiiatullina, Smits, Dugdale, Pierce, Suwannapoom & Poyarkov, 2025	0	Red barred green pit viper	Thailand
	T. erythrurus	Cantor, 1839	0	red-tailed bamboo pit viper	India (Assam and Sikkim), Bangladesh and Myanmar.
	T. fasciatus	Boulenger, 1896	0	banded pit viper	Indonesia: Djampea Island.
	T. flavomaculatus	Gray, 1842	2	Philippine pit viper	Philippine Islands: Agutayan, Batan, Camiguin, Catanduanes, Dinagat, Jolo, Leyte, Luzon, Mindanao, Mindoro, Negros and Polillo.
	T. gracilis	Ōshima, 1920	0	Kikushi habu	Central Taiwan.
	T. gumprechti	David, Vogel, Pauwels & Vidal, 2002	0	Gumprecht's green pit viper	China (Yunnan), Laos, Thailand, Vietnam.
	T. gunaleni	Vogel, David & Sidik, 2014	0	Gunalen's pit viper	Sumatra.
	T. guoi	Chen, S. Shi, Vogel & Ding, 2020	0	Guo's green pit viper	China, Vietnam, Thailand, Myanmar.
	T. hageni	Lidth de Jeude, 1886	0	Hagen's pit viper	Peninsular Thailand, West Malaysia, Singapore and Indonesia (Sumatra and the nearby islands of Bangka, Simalur, Nias, Batu and the Mentawai Islands.
	T. honsonensis	L. Grismer, Ngo & J. Grismer, 2008	0	Hon Son pit viper	Southern Vietnam.
	T. insularis	Kramer, 1977	0	Sunda Island pit viper, white-lipped island pit viper	Indonesia, Timor-Leste
	T. kanburiensis	M.A. Smith, 1943	0	Kanburi pit viper	Thailand.
	T. kirscheyi	Vogel, David & Sidik, 2022	0	Simeulue pit viper	Indonesia (Simeulue Island).
	T. kraensis	Idiiatullina, Nguyen, Pawangkhanant, Suwannapoom, Chanhome, Nguyen, David, Vogel & Poyarkov, 2024	0	Kra isthumus pit viper	India: Thailand.
	T. kuiburi	Sumontha, Suntrarachun, Pauwels, Pawangkhanant, Chomngam, Iamwiriyakul & Chanhome, 2021	0	Kui Buri pit viper	Thailand.
	T. labialis	Steindachner, 1867	0	Nicobar bamboo pit viper	India: Nicobar Islands.
	T. lanna	Idiiatullina, Nguyen, Pawangkhanant, Suwannapoom, Chanhome, Mirza, David, Vogel & Poyarkov, 2024	0	Lanna pit viper	Thailand.
	T. lii	Cai et al., 2026	0	Huaxi Green Pitviper	West Sichuan, China.
	T. liqibini	Liang et al., 2026	0	Li Qibin’s Green Pit Viper	Yunan Province, China.
	T. loong	Xu, Deng, Nyugen, Zhang, Weng, Liao, Sun, Peng, Vogel & Poyarkov, 2025	0	Kunming Green pit viper	China: Yunnan Province
	T. macrops	Kramer, 1977	0	large-eyed pit viper	Thailand, Cambodia and southern Vietnam.
	T. malcolmi	Loveridge, 1938	0	Malcolm's pit viper	Borneo.
	T. mayaae	Rathee, Purkayastha, Lalremsanga, Dalal, Biakzuala, Muansanga & Mirza, 2022	0	Maya's pit viper	India: Meghalaya (Ri Bhoi), Mizoram (Champhai), Assam (Guwahati)
	T. mcgregori	Taylor, 1919	0	McGregor's pit viper, McGregor's tree viper, Philippine pit viper	Batan Island, Philippines.
	T. medoensis	Zhao, 1977	0	Motuo bamboo pit viper	Northern India, northern Myanmar, and China (southeastern Xizang).
	T. mutabilis	Stoliczka, 1870	0	Central Nicobar pit viper, Central Nicobar bamboo pit viper	Central Nicobar Island.
	T. nebularis	Vogel, David & Pauwels, 2004	0	Cameron Highlands pit viper, clouded pit viper	West Malaysia (Cameron Highlands), Thailand.
	T. Nujiang	Liang, Ding, Vogel, Chen and Wu, 2025	0	Nujiang Green pit viper	China: Yunnan Province
	T. phuketensis	Sumontha, Kunya, Pauwels, Nitikul & Punnadee, 2011	0	Phuket pit viper	Thailand: Phuket Island.
	T. popeiorum	M.A. Smith, 1937	2	Popes' pit viper	Northern India, Myanmar, Thailand, West Malaysia, Vietnam and Indonesia (Sumatra, the Mentawai Islands of Siberut, Sipora, and North Pagai, and on the island of Borneo).
	T. Pretiosus	Xu, Nyugen, Wang, Zhang, Wei, Peng, Weng, Li, Ding, Vogel & Poyarkov, 2025	0	Yadong Green pit viper	China: Xizang Autonomous Region
	T. purpureomaculatus	Gray, 1832	0	mangrove pit viper	Bangladesh, Myanmar, Thailand, West Malaysia, Singapore and Indonesia (Sumatra).
	T. rubeus	(Malhotra, Thorpe, Mrinalini & L. Stuart, 2011)	0	ruby-eyed green pitviper	southern Vietnam and eastern Cambodia
	T. sabahi	Regenass & Kramer, 1981	0	Sabah bamboo pit viper, Sabah pit viper	Sabah, Sarawak
	T. salazar	Mirza, Bhosale, Phansalkar, Sawant, Gowande & Patel (2020)	0	Salazar's pit viper	India: western lowlands of Arunachal Pradesh
	T. schultzei	Griffin, 1909	0	Schultze's pit viper	Philippines: Palawan and Balabac.
	T. septentrionalis	Kramer, 1977	0	Nepal pit viper, Himalayan white-lipped pit viper	Bangladesh, India, Nepal
	T. sichuanensis	Guo & Wang, 2011	0	Sichuan pit viper	Sichuan, China
	T. stejnegeri	Schmidt, 1925	2	Stejneger's pit viper	India (Assam), and Nepal through Myanmar and Thailand to China (Guangxi, Guangdong, Hainan, Fujian, Zhejiang, Yunnan) and Taiwan.
	T. sumatranus^{T}	Raffles, 1822	0	Sumatran pit viper	Southern Thailand, West and East Malaysia (Sabah and Sarawak on Borneo) and Indonesia (Bangka, Billiton, Borneo, Sumatra and the nearby islands of Simalur, Nias, and possibly the Mentawai Islands [Sipora]).
	T. Tennasserimensis	Idiiatullina, Nguyen, Pawangkhanant, Suwannapoom, Chanhome, Mirza, David, Vogel & Poyarkov, 2024	0	Tennasserim pit viper	Thailand.
	T. tibetanus	Huang, 1982	0	Tibetan bamboo pit viper	China: Xiang (Tibet) Autonomous Region.
	T. truongsonensis	Orlov, Ryabov, Thanh & Cuc, 2004	0	Quang Binh pit viper	Central Vietnam
	T. uetzi	Vogel, Nguyen, David, 2023	0	Uetz's pit viper	Myanmar.
	T. venustus	Vogel, 1991	0	beautiful pit viper, brown-spotted pit viper	Southern Thailand
	T. vogeli	David, Vidal & Pauwels, 2001	0	Vogel's pit viper	Cambodia, Laos, Thailand, Vietnam.
	T. whitteni	Vogel, David & Sidik, 2022	0	Siberut pit viper	Indonesia (Siberut Island).
	T. yingjiangensis	Chen, Ding, J. Shi & Zhang, 2019	0		Southwest China
	T. yunnanensis	Schmidt, 1925	0	Yunnan bamboo pit viper	Southern China

*) Not including the nominate subspecies.
^{T}) Type species.

== Taxonomy ==
Additional species that may be recognized by other sources include:

- T. barati Regenass & Kramer, 1981. Commonly called Barat's bamboo viper, found in Indonesia.
- T. fucatus Vogel, David & Pauwels, 2004. Commonly called the Siamese peninsula pit viper and found in southern Thailand, Myanmar, Malaysia.

The genus Trimeresurus (sensu lato) has been the subject of considerable taxonomic work since 2000, resulting in the recognition of additional genera within this complex. Most authors now recognise the genus Protobothrops for the species cornutus, flavoviridis, jerdonii, kaulbacki, mucrosquamatus, tokarensis, xiangchengensis, since these have been shown not to be closely related to other Trimeresurus in recent phylogenetic analyses.

In addition, Malhotra and Thorpe (2004) proposed a radical shake up of the entire genus, splitting Trimeresurus into seven genera. Their proposed arrangement (including species described since 2004) is shown in the table below:

Genus	Species included
Trimeresurus	andalasensis, borneensis, brongersmai, gramineus, malabaricus, puniceus, salazar, strigatus, trigonocephalus, wiroti
Cryptelytrops	albolabris, andersonii, cantori, erythrurus, fasciatus, honsonensis (Hon Son Pit Viper), insularis, kanburiensis, labialis, macrops, purpureomaculatus, rubeus, septentrionalis, venustus
Himalayophis	tibetanus
Parias	flavomaculatus, hageni, malcolmi, mcgregori, schultzei, sumatranus
Peltopelor	macrolepis
Popeia	barati, buniana, fucata, nebularis, popeiorum, sabahi
Viridovipera	gumprechti, medoensis, stejnegeri, truongsonensis, vogeli, yunnanensis

This new arrangement has been followed by many, but not all subsequent authors.

David et al. (2011) considered some of the genera of Malhotra & Thorpe to be subgenera of the genus Trimeresurus, creating new combinations such as "Trimeresurus (Parias) flavomaculatus", "Trimeresurus (Popeia) popeiorum", "Trimeresurus (Viridovipera) stejnegeri", etc.

== Gallery ==
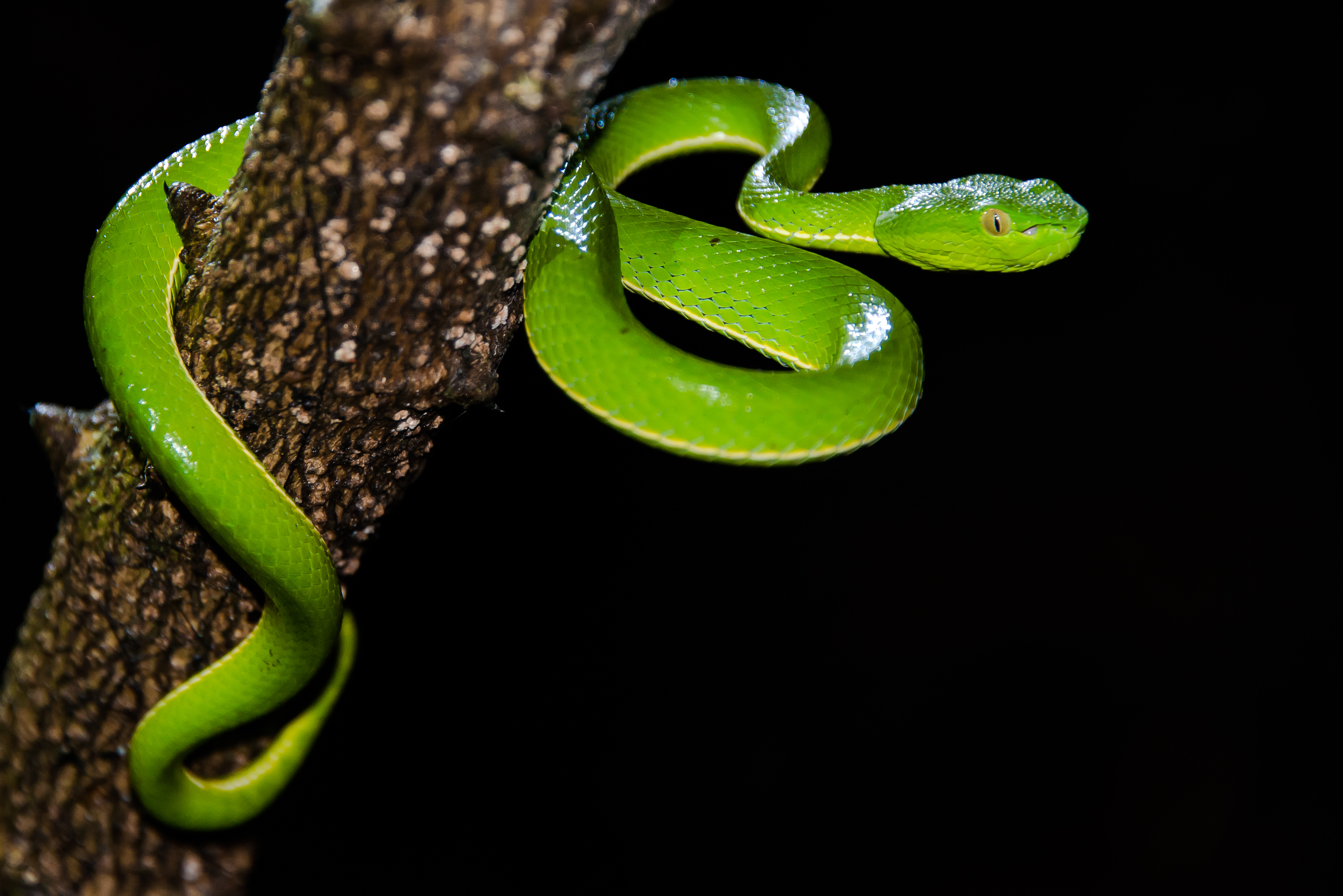
A juvenile T. vogeli in Khao Yai National Park, Thailand

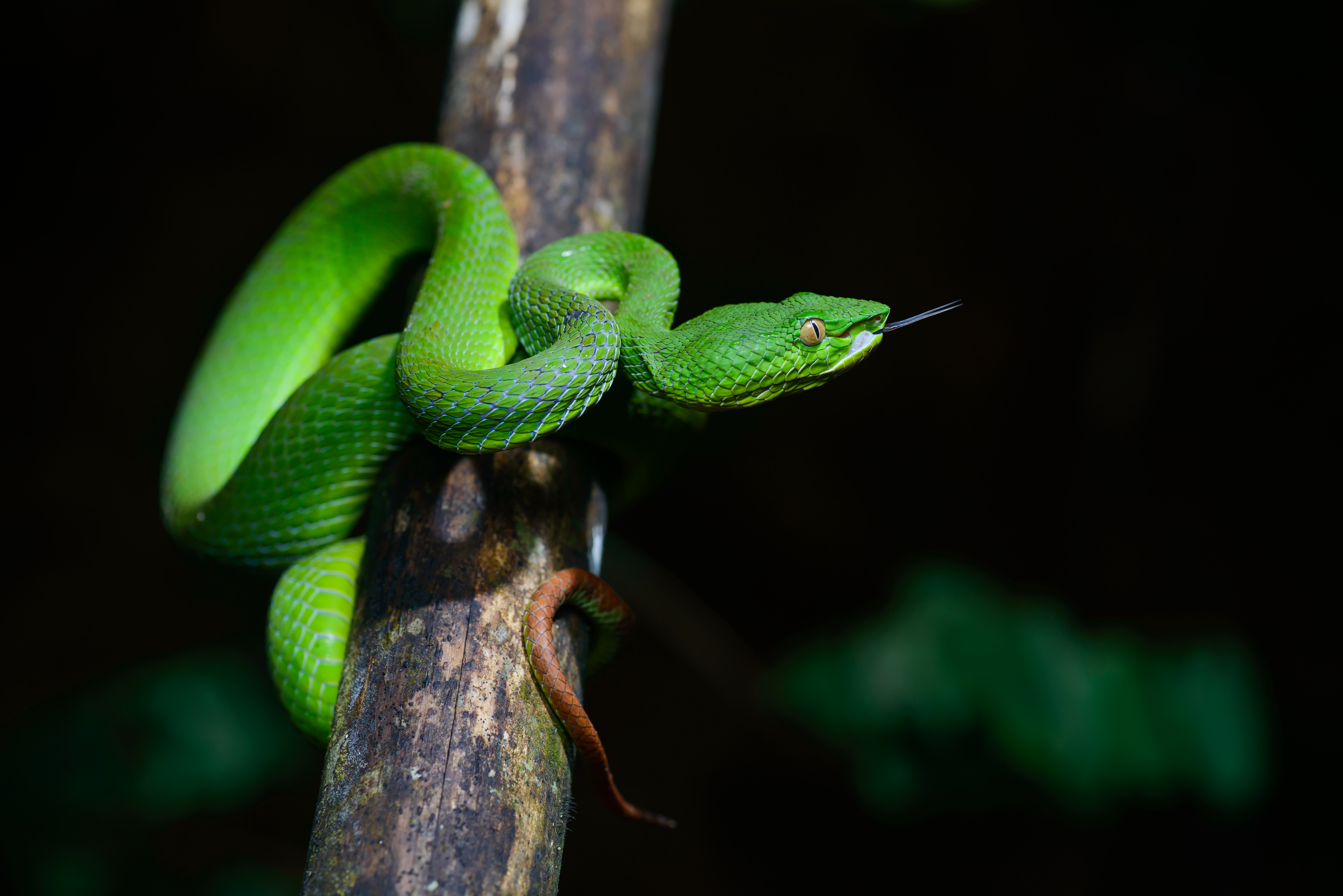
Trimeresurus fucatus from Khao Sok National Park, Thailand

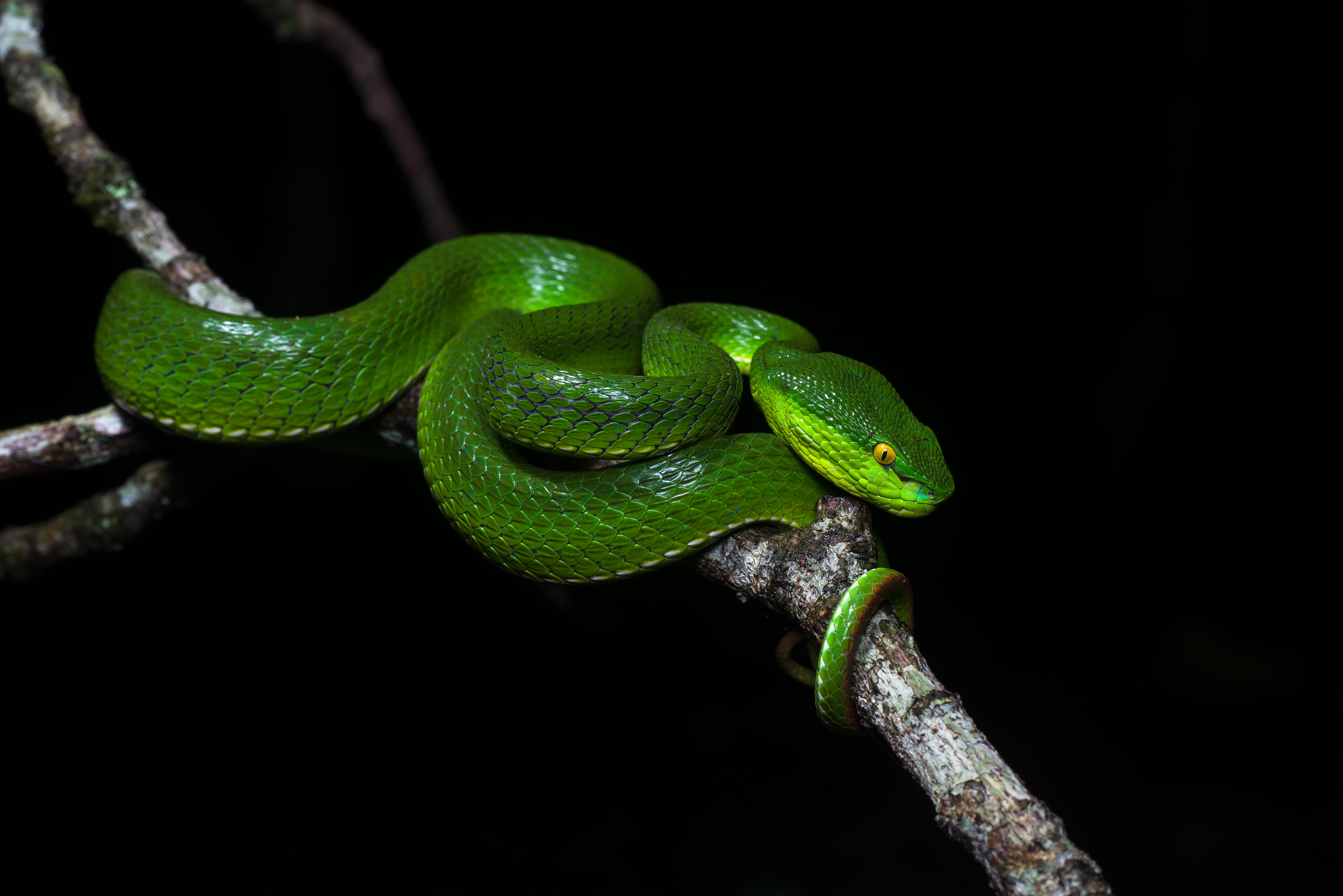
Trimeresurus albolabris from Kaeng Krachan National Park, Thailand

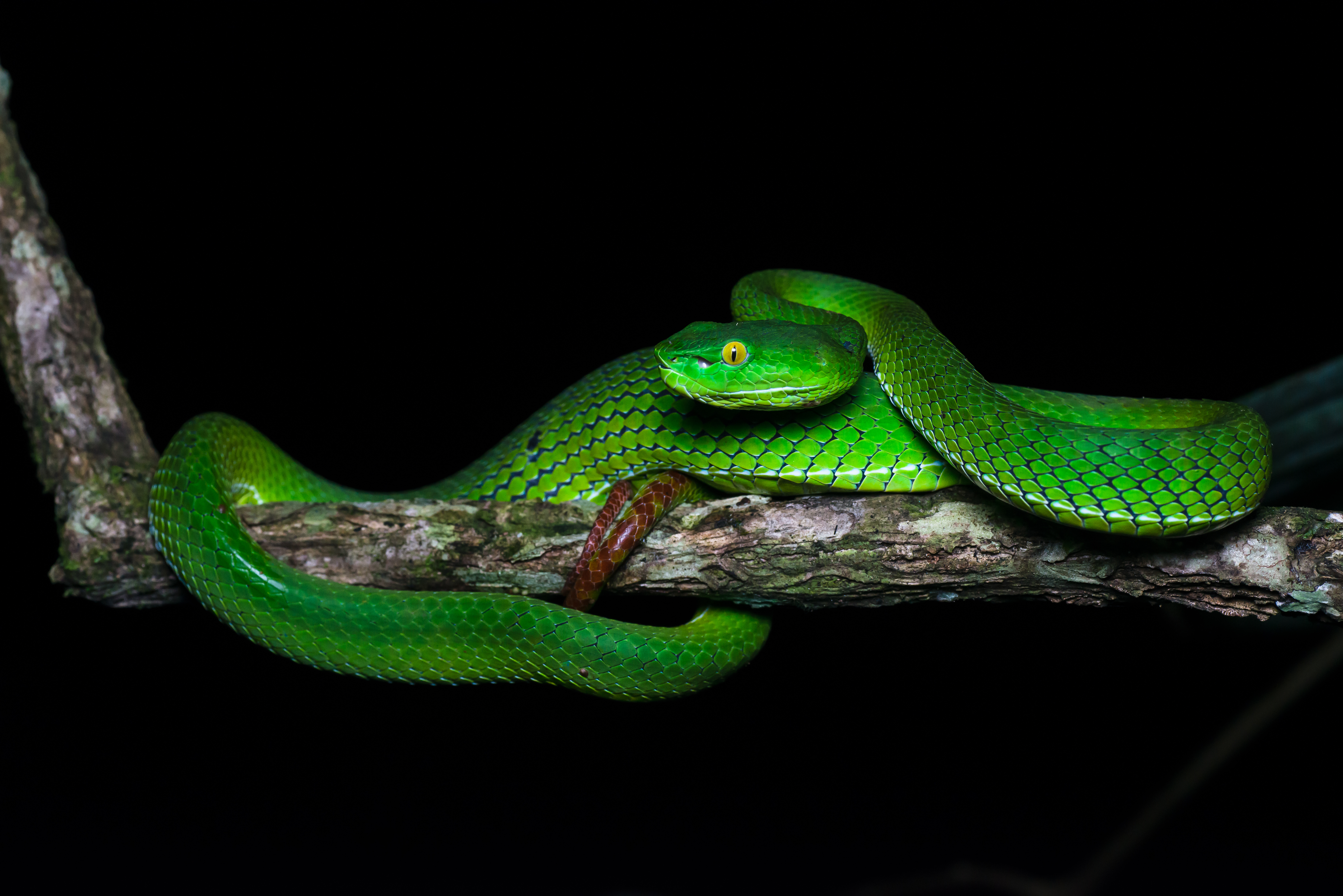
Trimeresurus gumprechti, Gumprecht's green pit viper, from Phu Hin Rong Kla National Park, Thailand

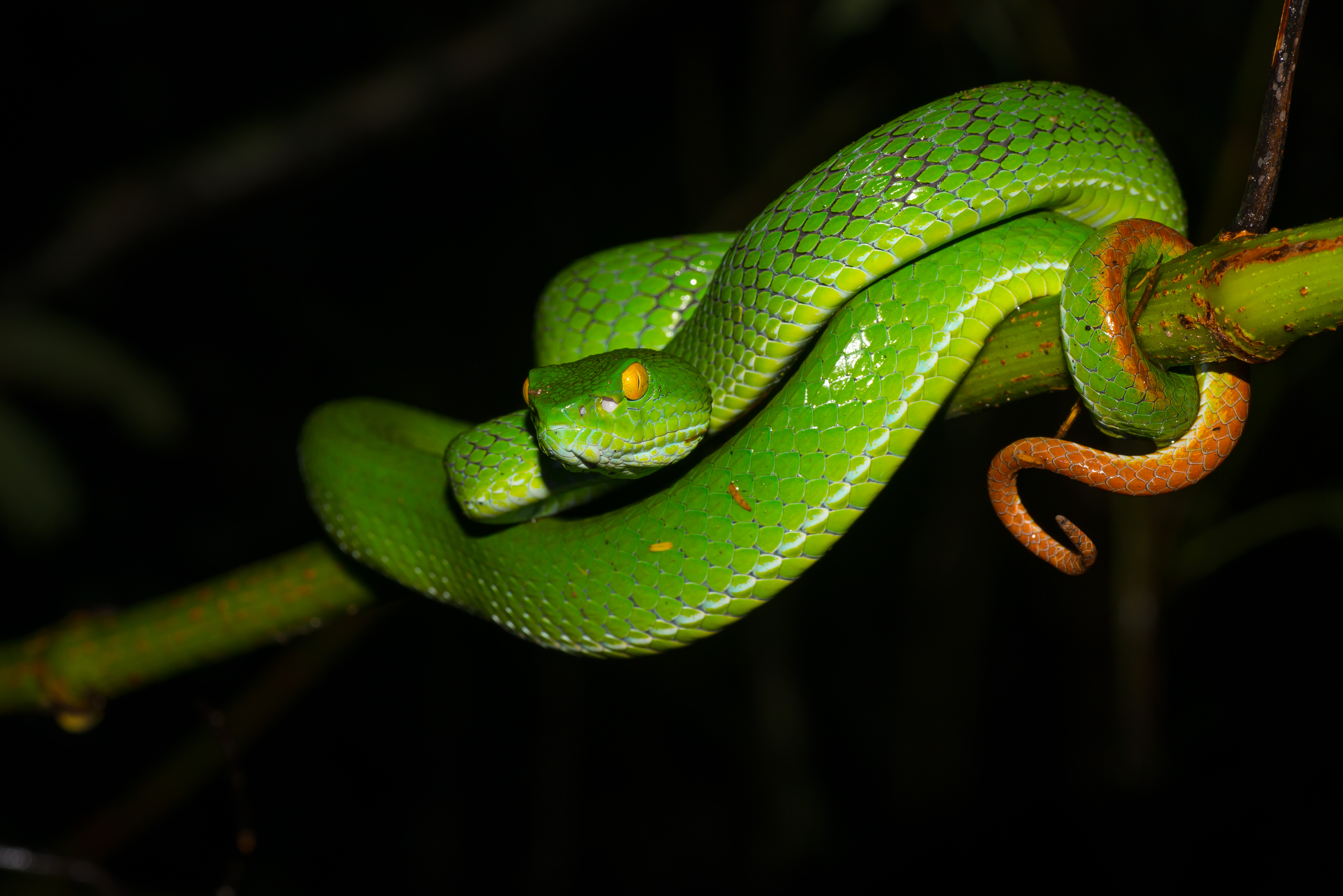
Trimeresurus macrops from Khao Yai National Park, Thailand

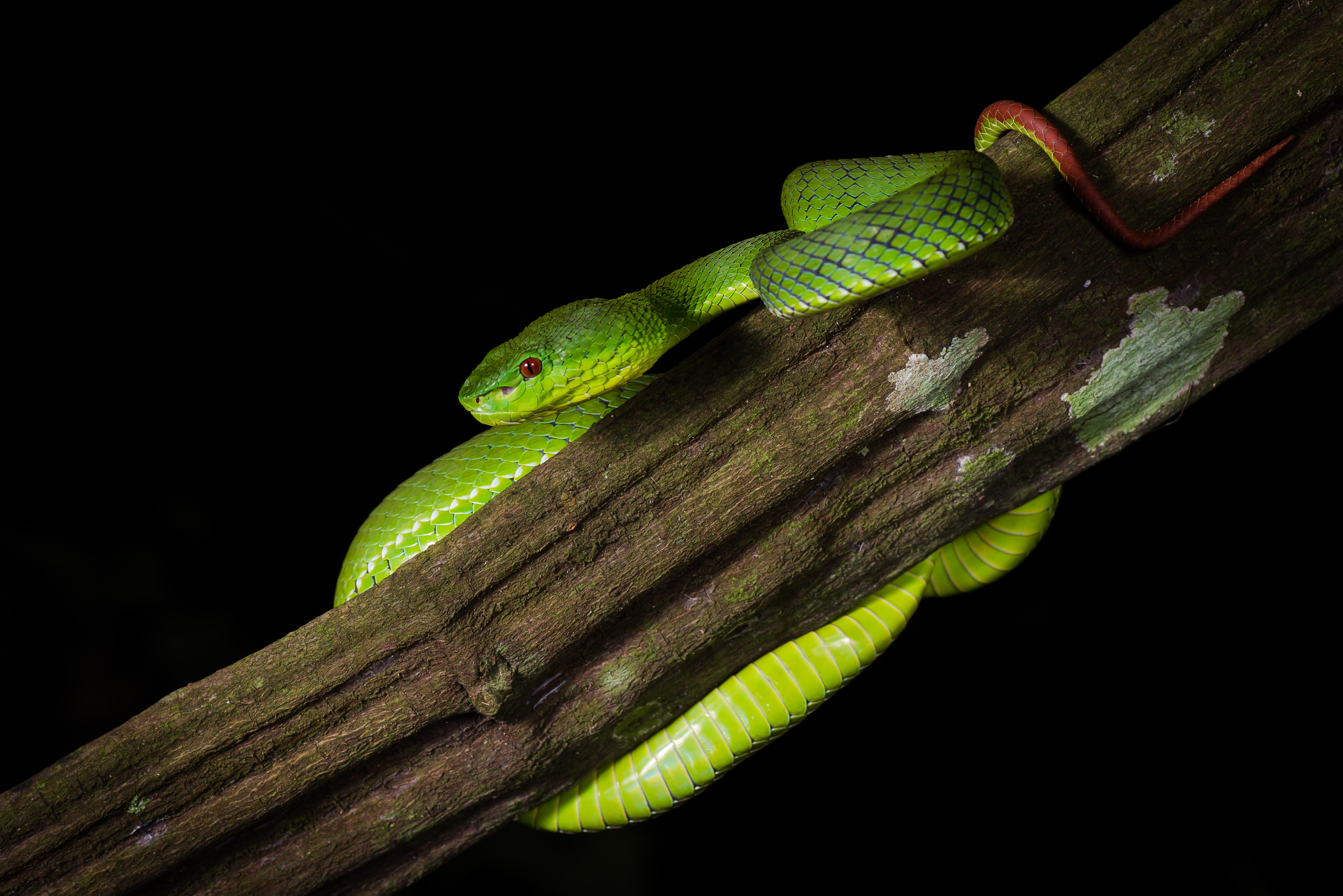
Trimeresurus popeiorum from Kaeng Krachan National Park, Thailand

== See also ==
- Craspedocephalus
- Ovophis
- Protobothrops
