= Trimeresurus tibetanus =

Conservation status
- Least Concern (IUCN 3.1)

Scientific classification
- Kingdom: Animalia
- Phylum: Chordata
- Class: Reptilia
- Order: Squamata
- Suborder: Serpentes
- Family: Viperidae
- Genus: Trimeresurus
- Species: T. tibetanus

Binomial name
- Trimeresurus tibetanus Huang, 1982

Synonyms
- Trimeresurus tibetanus Huang, 1982; Trimeresurus karanshahi Orlov & Helfenberger, 1998; Himalayophis tibetanus — Malhotra & Thorpe, 2004; Trimeresurus (Himalayophis) tibetanus — David et al., 2011

Species of snake

Trimeresurus tibetanus, also commonly known as the Tibetan bamboo pit viper and the Tibetan pit viper, is a species of venomous pit viper in the family Viperidae. The species is found only in Tibet. There are no subspecies that are recognized as being valid.

== Description ==
The scalation of T. tibetanus includes 21 (19 or 20) rows of dorsal scales at midbody, 147–152/145–159 ventral scales in males/females, 46–54/40–48 subcaudal scales in males/females, and 7–9 supralabial scales.

== Geographic range ==
T. tibetanus is endemic to Tibet (Tibet Autonomous Region, China). The type locality given is "Xizang Province, Nielamou District, Quekesumou, altitude 3,200 metres (10,500 ft)". In their English translation of Huang's publication, David and Tong (1997) list the type locality as "Tibet", but give "Naylam, Chokesumo" in the summary.

== Habitat ==
T. tibetanus is found at altitudes of 2,700–3,200 m (8,900–10,500 ft) in a variety of natural habitats, including forest, shrubland, grassland, and rocky areas, and it has also been found disturbed areas such as cropland.

== Reproduction ==
T. tibetanus has been observed to be both oviparous and ovoviviparous.

== Etymology ==
The specific name, karahahi, of the junior synonym is in honor of Nepali zoologist Karan Bahadur Shah.
