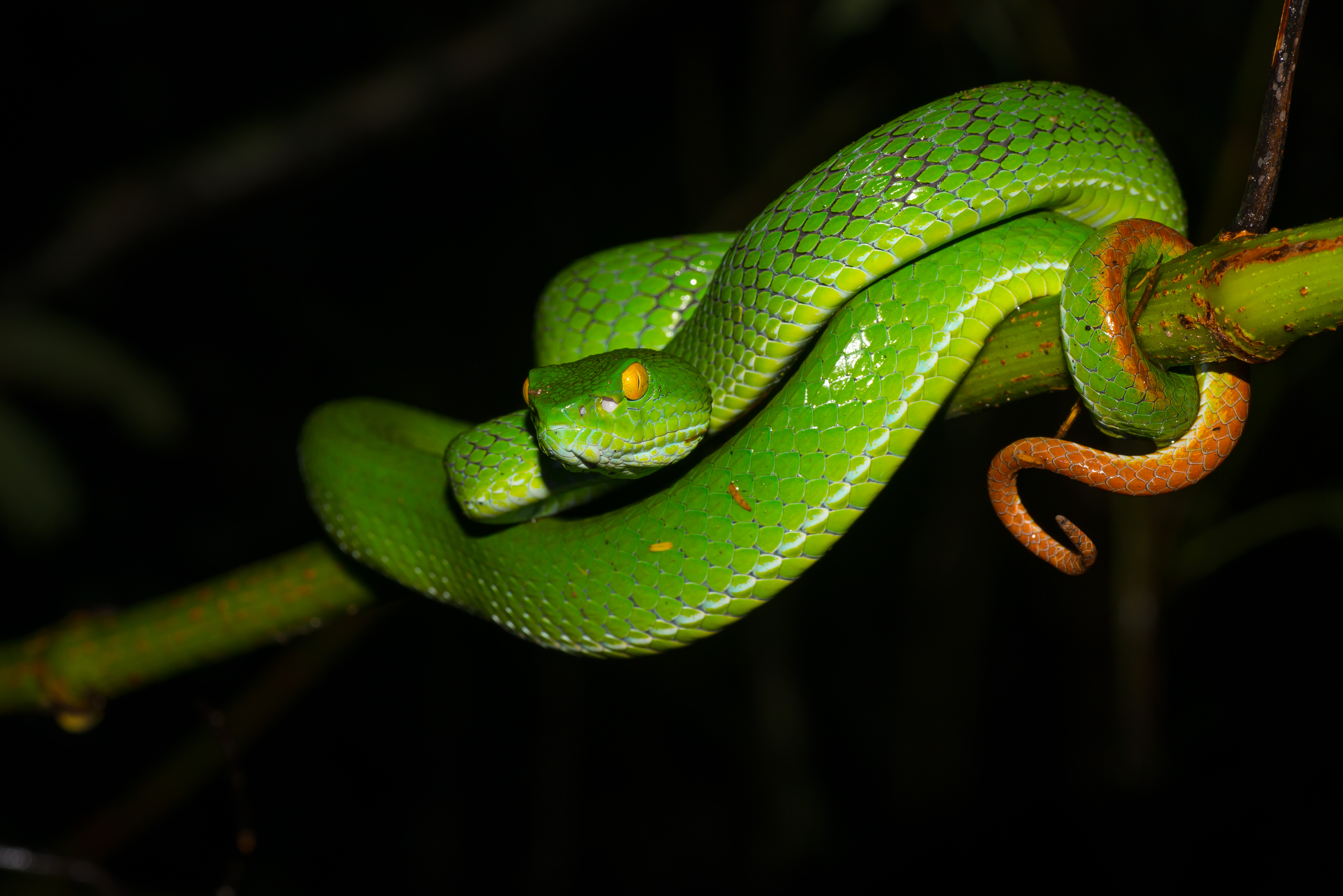
- Trimeresurus macrops - Khao Yai National Park, Thailand

Conservation status
- Least Concern (IUCN 3.1)

Scientific classification
- Kingdom: Animalia
- Phylum: Chordata
- Class: Reptilia
- Order: Squamata
- Suborder: Serpentes
- Family: Viperidae
- Genus: Trimeresurus
- Species: T. macrops

Binomial name
- Trimeresurus macrops Kramer, 1977

Synonyms
- Trimeresurus macrops Kramer, 1977; Cryptelytrops macrops – Malhotra & Thorpe, 2004; Trimeresurus (Trimeresurus) macrops – David et al., 2011

= Trimeresurus macrops =

Species of snake

Trimeresurus macrops is a venomous pit viper species endemic to Southeast Asia. No subspecies are currently recognized. Common names include large-eyed pitviper, green pit viper, and Kramer's pit viper.

== Description ==
It can be distinguished from other green pit vipers by the relatively large size of its eyes, which is especially noticeable in adult specimens, and to which the specific name, macrops, refers.

== Breeding ==
According to Strine, Green pit vipers mate during the end of the rainy season, between September and October. Female vipers will pull male vipers up the tree and begin mating.

== Geographic range ==
It is found in Southeast Asia in northern Cambodia, Laos, Thailand, and southern Vietnam. The type locality given is "Bangkok, Thailand".

== Venom ==
T. macrops belongs to the genus Trimeresurus, a group of Asian vipers with primarily hemotoxic venom — a type of venom that can destroy blood cells, disrupt blood clotting, and damage organ function. A bite from this viper's better-studied cousin, the white-lipped pit viper, is said to cause effects ranging from mild envenomation to death. The broader viper family, Viperidae, includes some of the deadliest snakes in the world, responsible for more human fatalities than any other type of snake.
