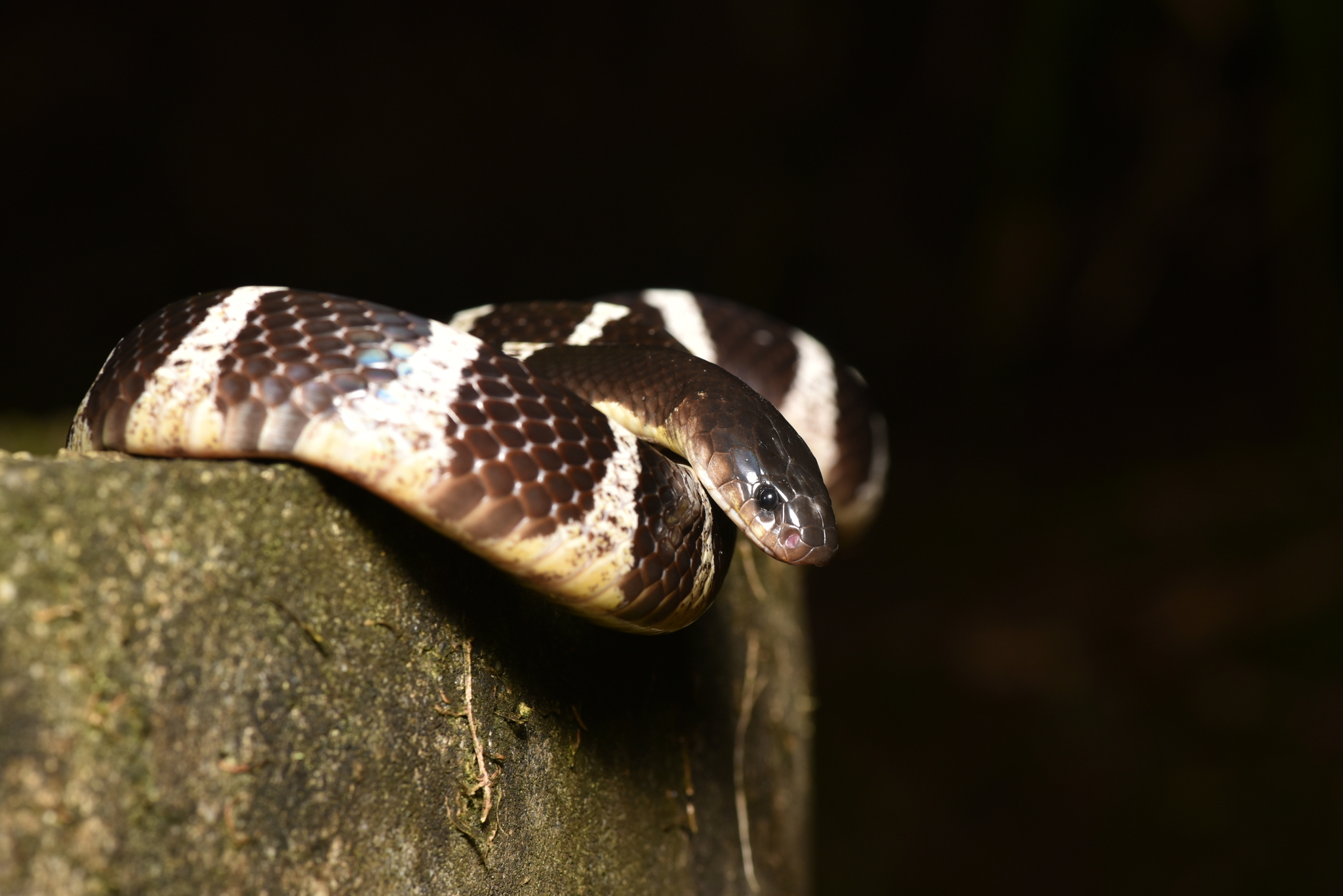

Conservation status
- Vulnerable (IUCN 3.1)

Scientific classification
- Kingdom: Animalia
- Phylum: Chordata
- Class: Reptilia
- Order: Squamata
- Suborder: Serpentes
- Family: Elapidae
- Genus: Bungarus
- Species: B. multicinctus

Binomial name
- Bungarus multicinctus Blyth, 1861
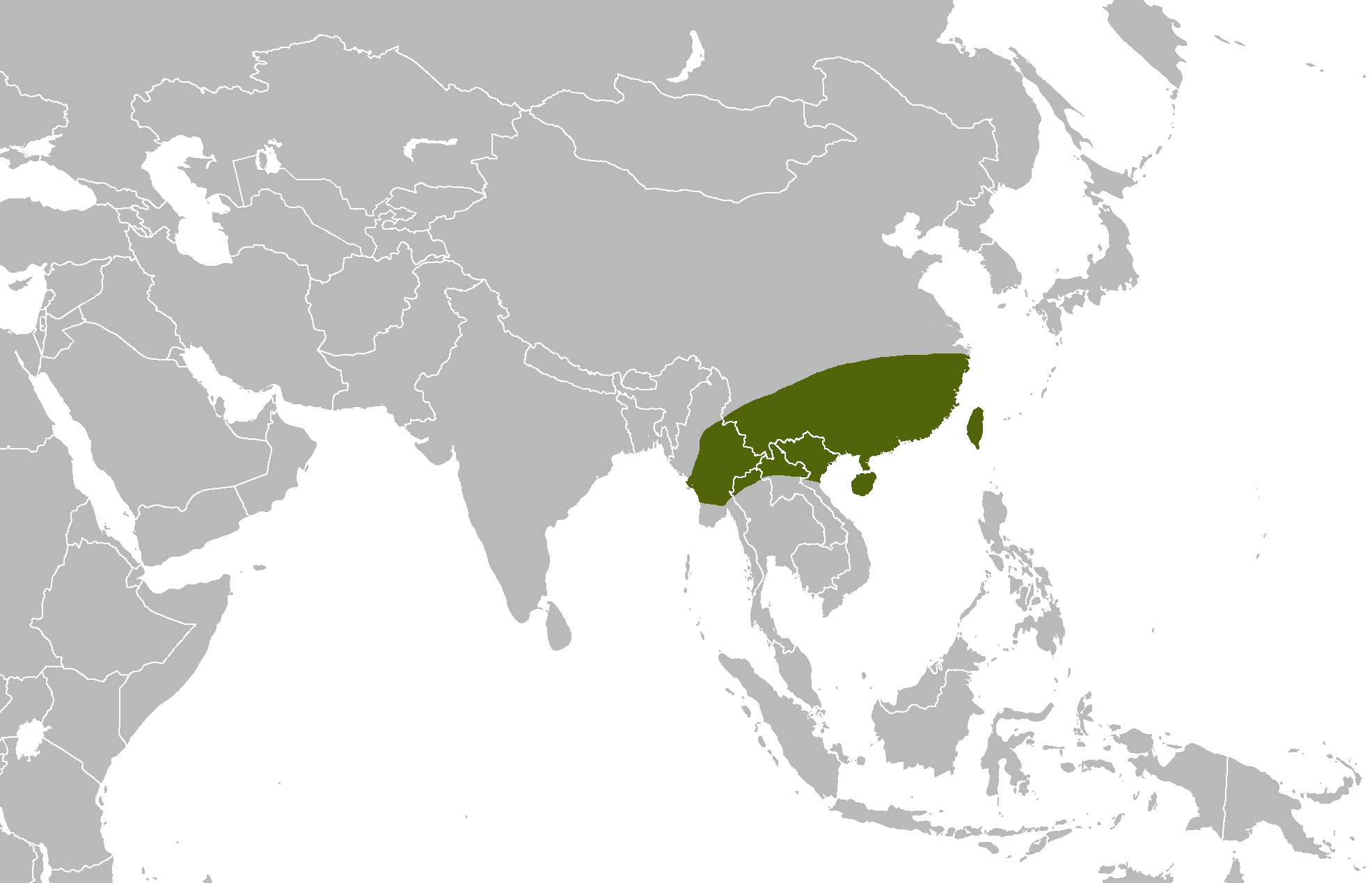
- Range of the many-banded krait

= Many-banded krait =

Venomous species of elapid snake

The many-banded krait (Bungarus multicinctus), also known as the Taiwanese krait or the Chinese krait, is an extremely venomous species of elapid snake found in much of central and southern China and Southeast Asia. The species was first described by the scientist Edward Blyth in 1861. Averaging 1 to 1.5 m (3.5 to 5 ft) in length, it is a black or bluish-black snake with many white bands across its body. The many-banded krait mostly inhabits marshy areas throughout its geographical distribution, though it does occur in other habitat types.

== Taxonomy ==
Zoologist and pharmacist Edward Blyth described the many-banded krait as a new species in 1861, noting that it had many more bands than the banded krait (Bungarus fasciatus). It still bears its original name Bungarus multicinctus. The generic name is a Latinisation of Telugu baṅgāru, "krait." The specific name multicinctus is derived from the Latin multi-, combining form of multus, "much, many", and Latin cinctus, past participle of cingere, "to encircle"—as in a "band". The common name "krait" is from Hindi (करैत karait), which is perhaps ultimately derived from the Sanskrit word (काल kāla), which means "black". It is also called as "கட்டுவிரியன் (kattuviriyan)" in Tamil, a common name given to the genus Bungarus.

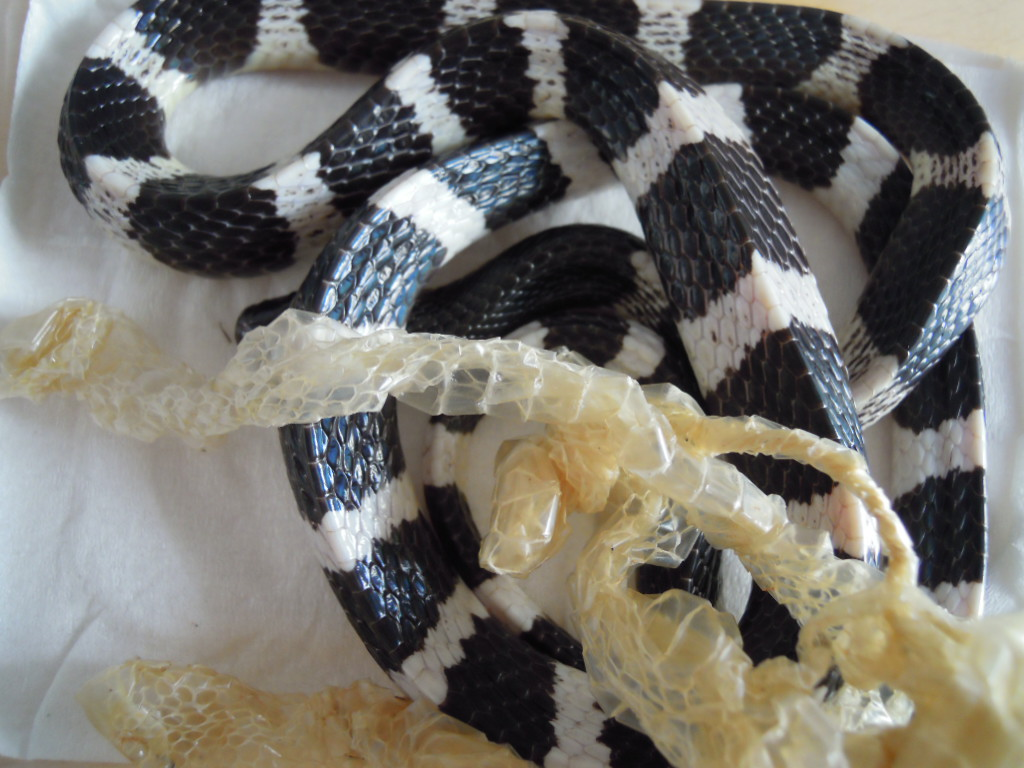
Specimen after shedding skin

This species has two subspecies, the nominate Bungarus multicinctus multicinctus, and Bungarus multicinctus wanghaotingi.

American herpetologist Clifford H. Pope described Bungarus wanghaotingi in 1928 from a specimen from southwestern Yunnan Province collected in November, 1926 by a Walter Granger. Naming it for zoological artist Mr. Wang Hao-t'ing, of Beijing, he distinguished it from B. multicinctus by its more numerous dorsal bands and from B. candidus by its higher ventral scale count. This taxon is also found in Myanmar, in Kachin State, Rakhine State and Sagaing Division. Herpetologist Alan Leviton and colleagues suspect there are further undescribed taxa within the species complex.

Mao et al. (1983) showed that this species, Bungarus multicinctus was slightly distinct from the other members of its genus and was immunologically more similar to Laticauda, terrestrial Australian elapids, and true sea snakes than it is to Elapsoidea sundevalli (Sundevall's garter snake), Naja naja (Indian cobra) or two Micrurus species (New World or American coral snakes). Minton (1981), Schwaner et al. and Cadle & Gorman (1981) all suggested similar things to Mao et al. (1983) based on immunological data. The many-banded krait was more similar to the Australian elapids, Laticauda and true sea snakes than they were to numerous elapids they were compared to.

A 2016 genetic analysis showed that the many-banded krait is the sister taxon to the Malayan krait (Bungarus candidus), with the two arising from a lineage that gave rise to the greater black krait (Bungarus niger).

== Distribution and habitat ==
This species is found throughout Taiwan (including the Archipelagos of Matsu and Kinmen), Hong Kong, Myanmar (Burma), Laos, and northern Vietnam. It may also be found in Thailand.

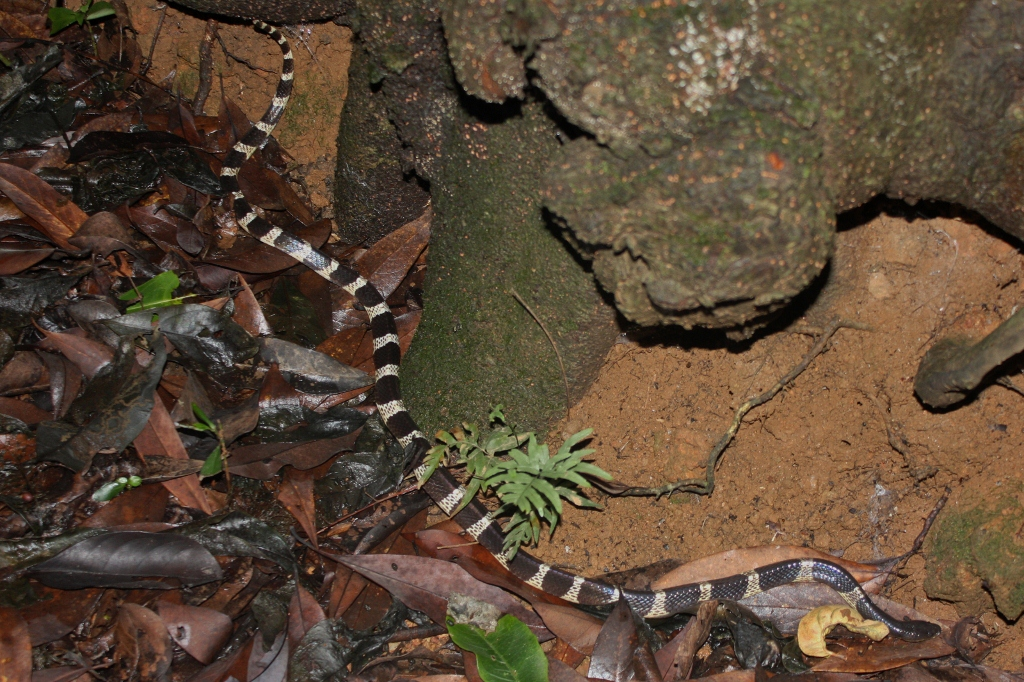
At Tai Mo Shan, Hong Kong

In China, kraits with white cross-bands were assumed to be the many-banded krait, however a 2017 genetic study found that most museum specimens classified thus were actually the Malayan krait, and that true many-banded kraits were restricted to southern China (Fujian, Jiangxi, Hubei, Hunan, Hainan, Zhejiang, Guangdong, and Guangxi). The study authors raised the possibility that other specimens tagged as many-banded kraits from Vietnam, Thailand, and Myanmar may also be Malayan kraits.

Although it can be found in elevations up to about 1,500 m (4,900 ft), it is far more commonly found in humid lowland areas, and most often observed in subtropical, marshy regions of its range. It is also frequently found in shrublands, woodlands, agricultural fields, and mangroves, often adjacent to water, such as rivers, streams, rice paddies, and ditches. It may also sometimes be found in villages and suburban areas. It is able to survive in other habitats also.

== Description ==
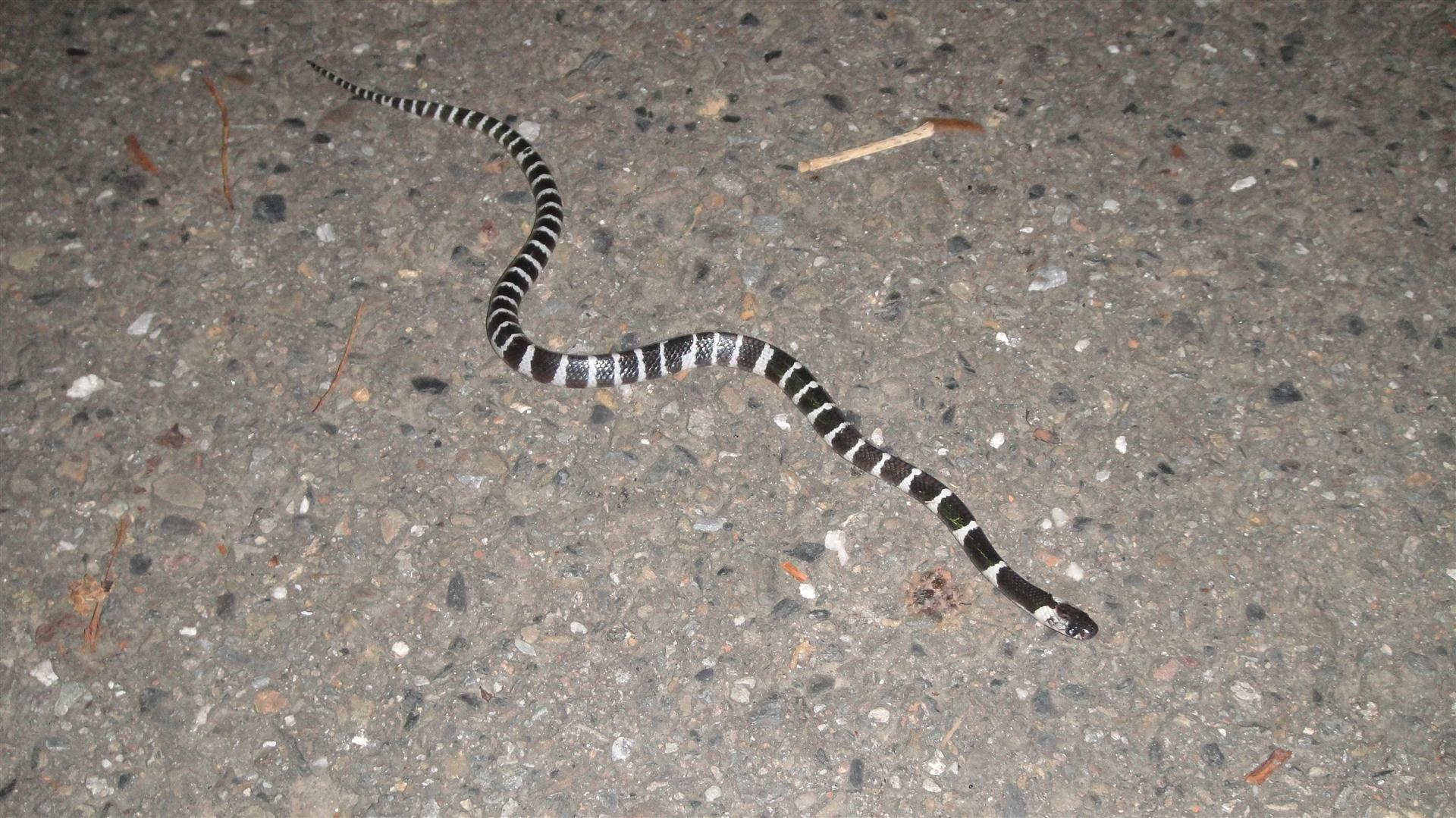
A many-banded krait found in Taiwan

The many-banded krait is a medium to large sized species of snake, averaging 1 to 1.5 m (3.5 to 5 ft) in length, with maximum lengths reaching 1.85 m (6.1 ft). Its body is slender and moderately compressed. The scales of this species are smooth and glossy, with a noticeably distinct vertebral ridge. The colour of the snake is black to dark bluish-black with approximately 21–30 white or creamy white cross bands along the entire length of its upper body. More banding is seen in longer than average sized specimens. The tail is short and pointed, that is also black in colour with alternating white cross bands, of which there are 7–11. The belly of the snake is usually white in colour, but could be an off white or creamy white. The head is primarily black in colour, is broad and oval in shape, but flat and slightly distinct from the body. The eyes are small and black in colour. The pupils are black in colour, thus making them hardly noticeable as they blend in with the rest of the eyes. This species has large nostrils. The fangs are small, fixed and are located in the anterior of the upper jaw. Juveniles of this species usually have whitish blotches on the lower side of their heads.

=== Scalation ===
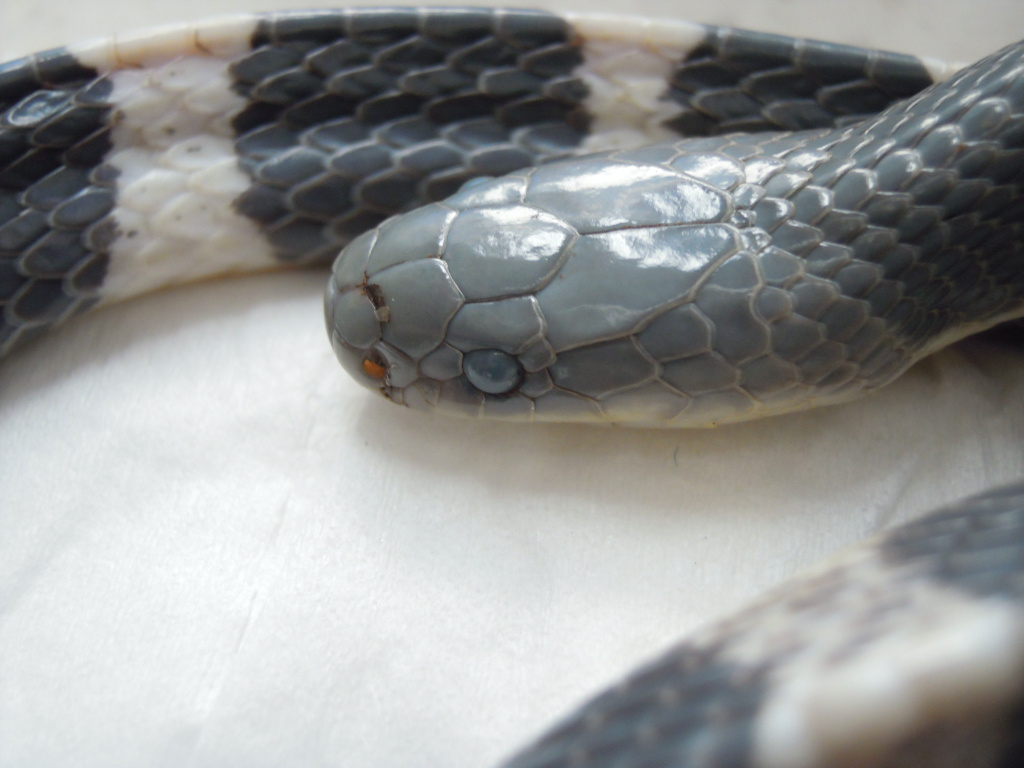
Close-up of the head with scalation showing

The number and arrangement of scales on a snake's body are a key element of identification to species level. The many-banded krait has 15 rows of dorsal scales at midbody, and an undivided anal scale. (Note: A divided scale is one split down the midline into two scales.) Males have 200 to 231 ventral scales and 43 to 54 undivided subcaudal scales, while females have 198 to 227 ventral scales and 37 to 55 subcaudal scales.

== Behaviour and diet ==
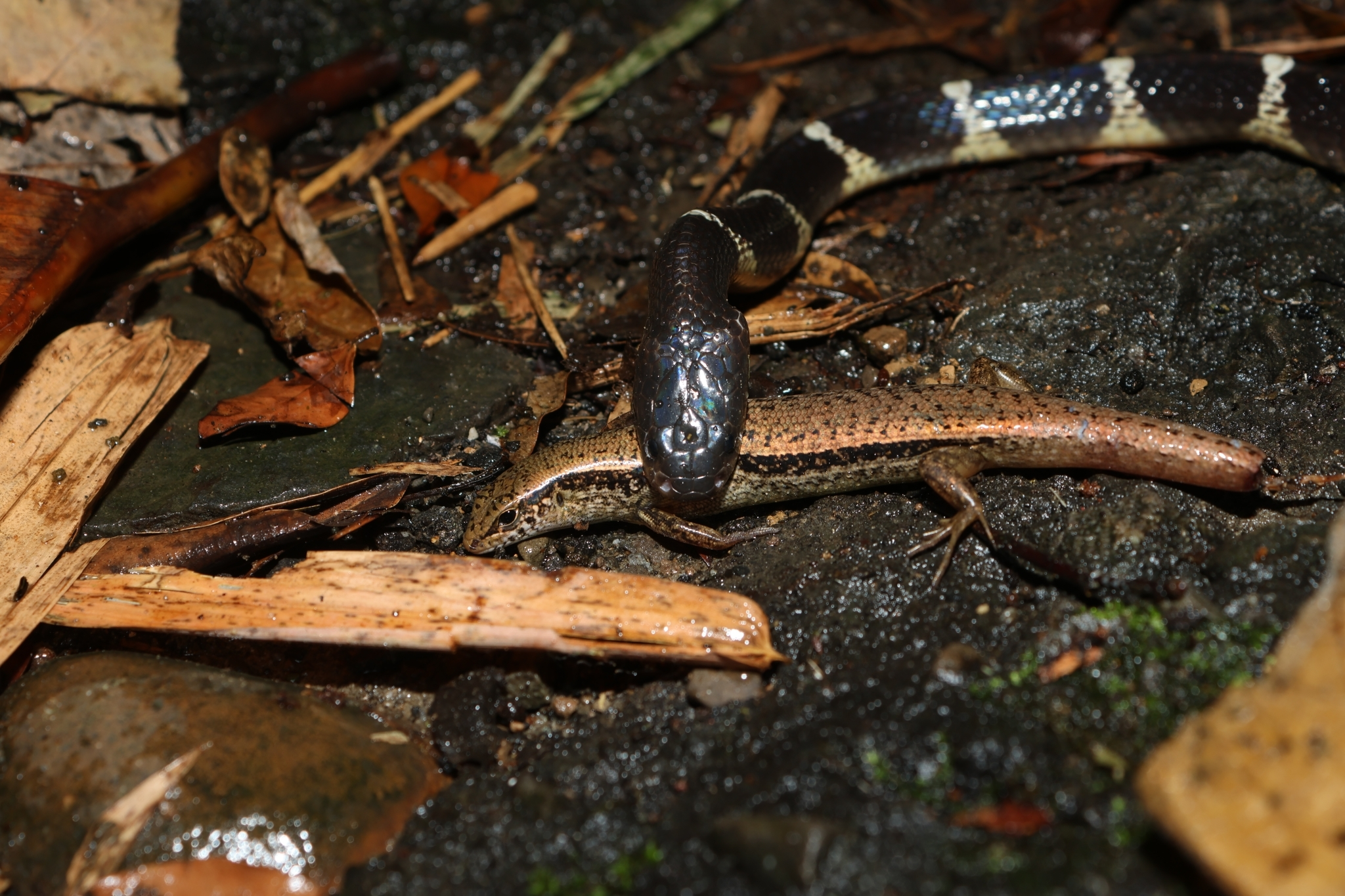
Feeding on an Indian forest skink

The snake is nocturnal, and may be more defensive at night. It is, however, a timid and placid species of snake. In the daytime, it hides under stones or in holes. The snake appears from April and retreats into hibernation in November. It is considered to be more defensive than the banded krait (Bungarus fasciatus), thrashing about as it is handled.

Unlike other Bungarus species, who are primarily snake-eaters, the many-banded krait usually feeds on fish, but it is also preys on other species of snakes, including members of its own species. This species also feeds on rodents, eels, frogs, and occasionally lizards.

=== Reproduction ===
There is limited information on the reproductive habits of this snake. Like many elapids, many-banded kraits are oviparous. Mating occurs between the months of August and September. Females usually deposit 3–15 eggs, although up to 20 eggs can be produced. The eggs are deposited in late spring or early summer, usually in the month of June. Eggs usually hatch about a month and a half later. The hatchlings are around 25 centimetres (9.8 in) in length.

The oldest recorded many-banded krait was a captive specimen that lived 13.7 years.

== Venom and toxins ==
The venom of the many-banded krait consists of both pre- and postsynaptic neurotoxins (known as α-bungarotoxins and β-bungarotoxins, among others). By weight, almost half of the protein content of the venom is composed of β-bungarotoxins.

The average venom yield from specimens kept on snake farms is about 4.6 mg—19.4 mg per bite. The venom is highly toxic with LD_{50} values of 0.09 mg/kg—0.108 mg/kg SC, 0.113 mg/kg IV and 0.08 mg/kg IP on mice. Based on numerous LD_{50} (MLD) studies on mice dating back to 1943, the many-banded krait is among the most venomous land snakes in the world. To & Tin (1943) reported 0.07 mg/kg (IV), Lee et al (1962) reported 0.16 mg/kg (SC), Fischer and Kabara (1967) list 0.2 mg/kg (IP), Lee and Tseng (1969) list 0.16 mg/kg (SC), Kocholaty et al (1971) listed 0.07 mg/kg (IV) and 0.08 mg/kg (IP), Minton (1974) listed 0.07 mg/kg (IV) and 0.08 mg/kg (IP), which are identical MLD values Kocholaty et al had reported in 1971 for the IV and IP routes, Minton further listed 0.19 mg/kg (SC).

α-Bungarotoxin is important for neuromuscular histology, it is known to bind irreversibly to receptors of the neuromuscular junction, and can be labelled with fluorescent proteins such as green fluorescent protein or the rhodamine dye tetramethylrhodamine isothiocyanate.

=== Clinical symptoms ===
The local symptoms of victims bitten by the many-banded krait are usually neither serious swelling nor pain; the victims merely feel slightly itchy and numb. Systemic symptoms occur, in general, one to six hours after being bitten by this snake. Symptoms may include bilateral ptosis, diplopia, discomfort in the chest, general ache, weak feeling in limbs, ataxia, glossolysis (paralysis of the tongue), loss of voice, dysphagia, tunnel vision, and difficulty breathing. In case of serious bite, suppression of breathing may occur, leading to death. Hyponatremia is also seen, but less commonly.

Estimated mortality rates associated with untreated bites from this species vary between studies from 25–35% to 70–100%. During the Vietnam War, American soldiers referred to the many-banded krait as the "two-step snake," in the mistaken belief that its venom was lethal enough to kill within two steps.

The many-banded krait gathered worldwide attention after a juvenile individual bit Joe Slowinski on 11 September 2001 in Myanmar. He died the following day, 29 hours after being bitten. The snake was initially thought to be of said species before being classified as a different species.
