= Snake H/ACA box small nucleolar RNA =

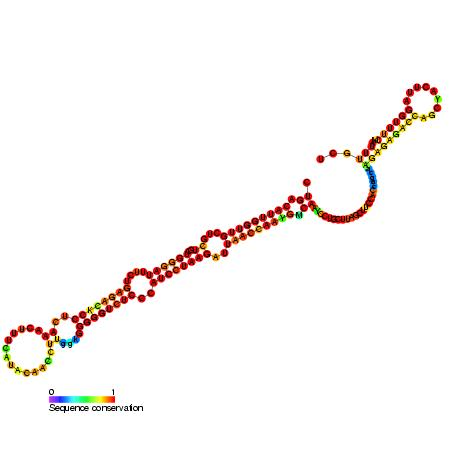

Identifiers
- Symbol: HACA_sno_Snake
- Rfam: RF00098

Other data
- RNA type: Gene;snRNA;snoRNA;H/ACA-box;
- PDB structures: PDBe

In molecular biology, Snake H/ACA box small nucleolar RNA refers to a number of very closely related non-coding RNA (ncRNA) genes identified in snakes which have been predicted to be small nucleolar RNAs (snoRNAs). This type of ncRNA is involved in the biogenesis of other small nuclear RNAs and are often referred to as 'guide' RNAs. They are usually located in the nucleolus of the eukaryotic cell which is a major site of snRNA biogenesis.

These snoRNA genes were initially identified in the introns of the cardiotoxin 4 and cobrotoxin genes of the Taiwan cobra (Bungarus multicinctus) and the Taiwan banded krait (Bungarus multicinctus) during sequencing of these genes. These snoRNAs are predicted to act as H/ACA box type methylation guides as they have the predicted hairpin-hinge-hairpin-tail structure and extended regions of complementarity to 5S ribosomal RNA (rRNA).
