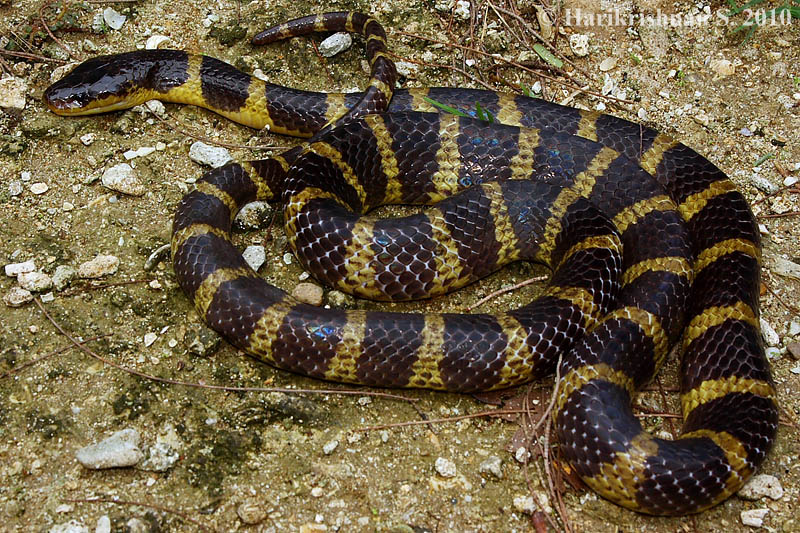

Conservation status
- Near Threatened (IUCN 3.1)

Scientific classification
- Kingdom: Animalia
- Phylum: Chordata
- Class: Reptilia
- Order: Squamata
- Suborder: Serpentes
- Family: Elapidae
- Genus: Bungarus
- Species: B. andamanensis

Binomial name
- Bungarus andamanensis Biswas & Sanyal, 1978
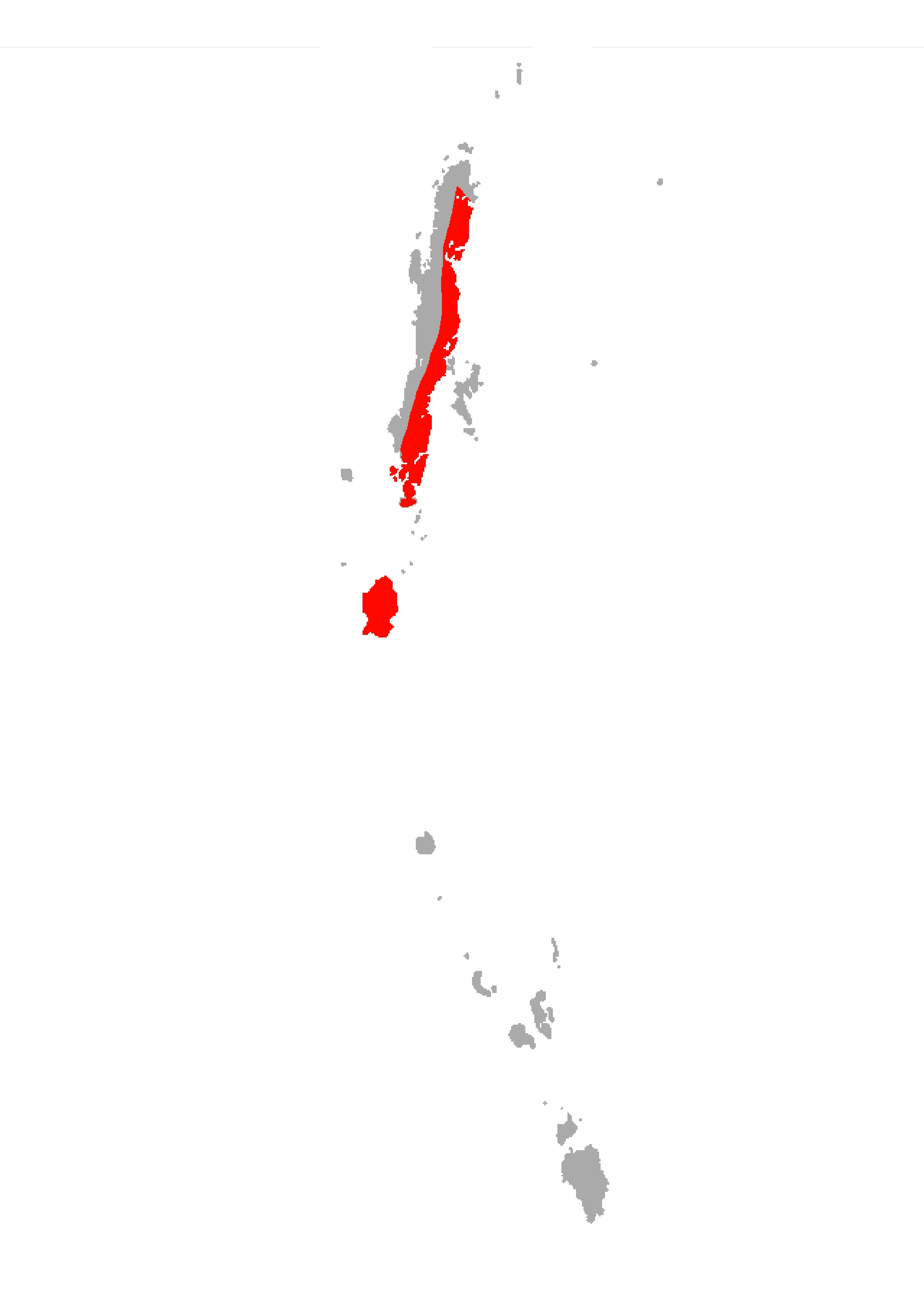

= Bungarus andamanensis =

Species of snake

Bungarus andamanensis, the South Andaman krait, is a species of krait, a venomous elapid snake, which is found in the Andaman Islands of India. It was first described by Biswas and Sanyal in 1978.

== Description ==
The Andaman krait is a medium-sized snake, growing up to 1.3 metres (4 ft 3 in) in length. Its body is cylindrical, and the head is slightly broader than the neck. The eyes are small and entirely black with round pupils.

=== Scalation ===
- Dorsal scales: Smooth, arranged in 15:15:15 rows, with vertebral scales strongly enlarged.
- Head scales: Internasals shorter than prefrontal scales. No loreal scale; the preocular scale contacts the posterior nasal. Two postocular scales, with temporal scales arranged in 1+2 configuration.
- Labial scales: 7 supralabials (the 3rd and 4th touch the eye; the 6th is the largest) and 7 infralabials (the first 3 contact the genials).
- Ventrals and subcaudals: 192–200 ventral scales and 40–47 entire subcaudal scales. The tail ends with a thick blunt point, and the anal plate is entire.

=== Coloration ===
The body is glossy black or brownish, often with blue iridescence. It features 39–47 narrow yellow or white equidistant cross-bars on the body and 9–13 on the tail, with the bands widening toward the belly. The underside is yellowish-cream with irregular black or brown spots, and the tail often has distinct brownish spots. The lips are yellowish. Juveniles display vibrant yellow cross-bars and a distinct "^"-shaped marking near the head.

== Distribution and habitat ==
The Andaman krait is endemic to the Andaman Islands and Little Andaman Islands in India. It inhabits a variety of environments, including:

- Paddy fields
- Low bushes on mountains and coastal areas
- Mangroves
- Freshwater streams

The species is frequently observed on roads after rains and has also been seen near termite mounds. It is extremely common in Little Andaman.

== Ecology ==
=== Behavior ===
The Andaman krait is nocturnal and primarily active during and after rains. When alarmed, it slightly flattens its body, coils loosely while hiding its head, and may produce a squeaking sound. Juveniles are most often seen in June, suggesting a seasonal breeding pattern.

=== Diet ===
The species mainly preys on other snakes, including water snakes, and occasionally on fish. Adult specimens are rare and are typically found near freshwater streams.

=== Reproduction ===
Little is known about the breeding biology of this species, but the presence of juveniles in June indicates potential seasonal reproduction.
