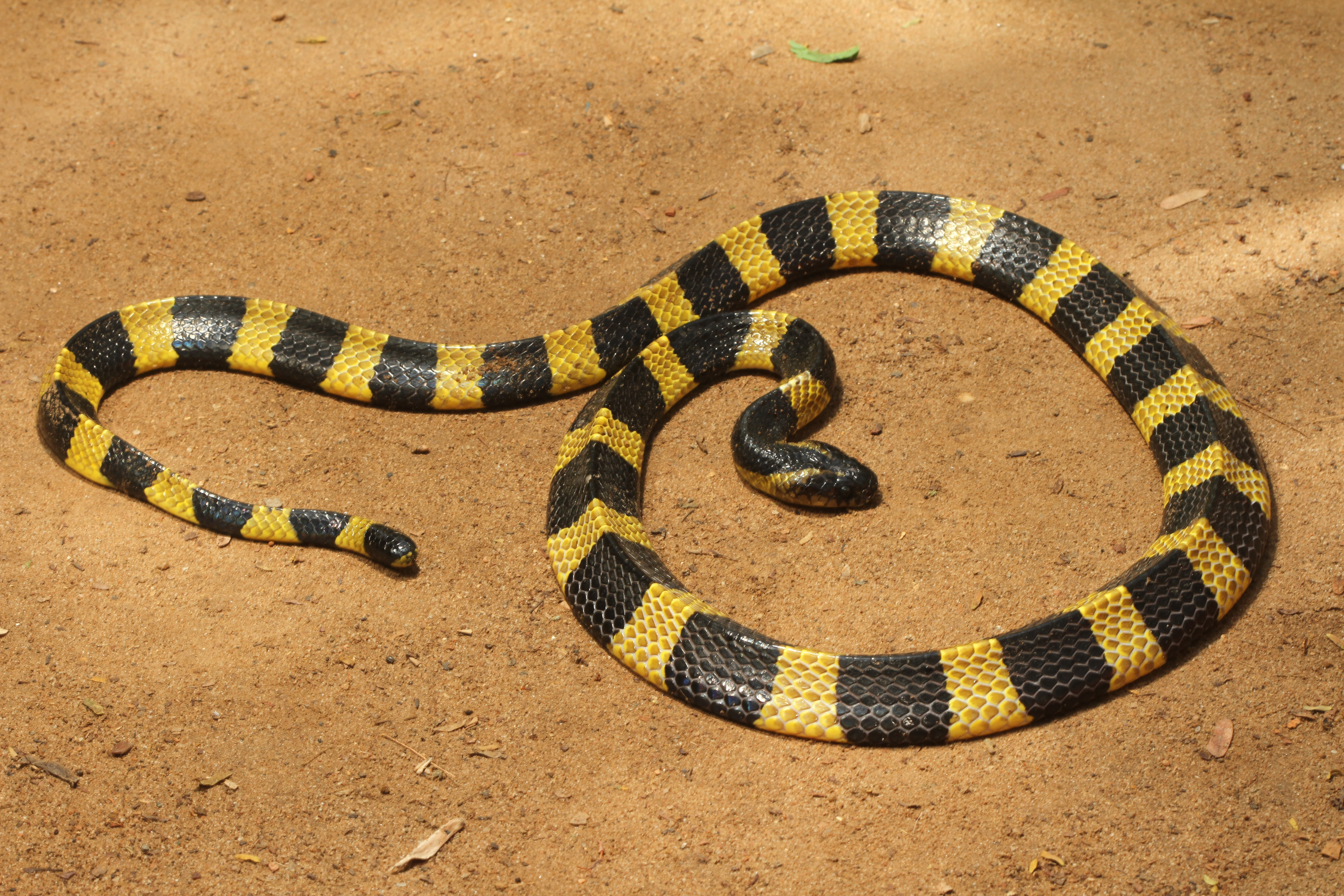
- Bungarus fasciatus (banded krait), the largest species of krait

Scientific classification
- Kingdom: Animalia
- Phylum: Chordata
- Class: Reptilia
- Order: Squamata
- Suborder: Serpentes
- Family: Elapidae
- Genus: Bungarus; Daudin, 1803

Type species
- Bungarus annularis Daudin, 1803

Synonyms
- Pseudoboa Oppel, 1811; Aspidoclonion Wagler, 1828; Megærophis Gray, 1849; Xenurelaps Günther, 1864

= Bungarus =

Genus of venomous snakes

Bungarus (commonly known as kraits /kraɪt/) is a genus of venomous snakes in the family Elapidae. The genus is native to Asia. Often found on the floor of tropical forests in South Asia, Southeast Asia and Southern China, they are medium-sized, highly venomous snakes with a total length (including tail) typically not exceeding 2 metres (6 ft 7 in). These are nocturnal ophiophagious predators which prey primarily on other snakes at night, occasionally taking lizards, amphibians and rodents. Most species are with banded patterns acting as a warning sign to their predators. Despite being considered as generally docile and timid, kraits are capable of delivering highly potent neurotoxic venom which is medically significant with potential lethality to humans. The genus currently holds 18 species and 5 subspecies.

== Distribution ==
Kraits are found in tropical and subtropical South and Southeast Asia and Indochina, ranging in the west from Iran, east through the Indian subcontinent (including Bangladesh, Nepal, Pakistan, and Sri Lanka) and into Southeast Asia (including the island of Borneo, Brunei, Cambodia, Indonesia, Laos, Malaysia, Myanmar, Thailand and Vietnam).

== Description ==
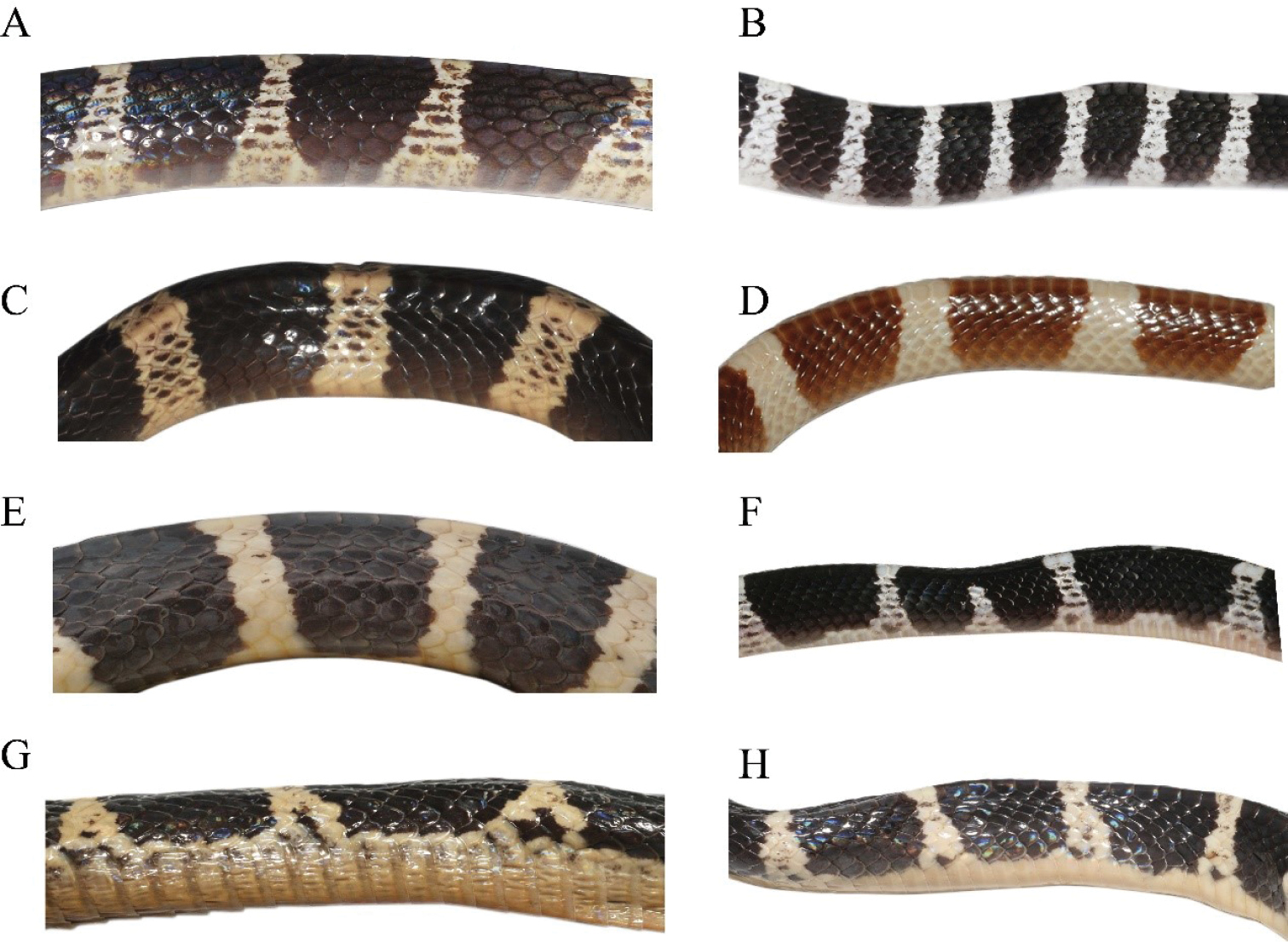
A-B: B. multicinctus C-D: B. candidus E-F: B. wanghaotingi G-H: B. suzhenae

Kraits usually range between 1.0 and 1.5 m (3 ft 3 in and 4 ft 11 in) in total length (including tail), although specimens as large as 2.0 m (6 ft 7 in) have been observed. The banded krait (B. fasciatus) may grow as large as 2.125 m (6 ft 11.7 in). Most species of kraits are covered in smooth, glossy scales arranged in bold, striped patterns of alternating black and light-colored areas. This may serve as aposematic colouration in its habitat of grassland and scrub jungle. The scales along the dorsal ridge of the back are hexagonal. The head is slender, and the eyes have round pupils. Kraits have pronounced dorsolateral flattening, which causes them to be triangular in cross section.

== Ecology ==
Kraits are nocturnal and ophiophagous, preying chiefly upon other snakes including those of their kinds, although occasional hunt for small rodents and lizards has been observed. They are seldom encountered during daytime while becoming highly alert at night. If disturbed, they usually flee; failing this they tend to coil up with the head underneath the body for protection. Though most kraits are docile and timid, some species thrash fiercely when caught for relocation. Repeated provocation may result in bites which are the last resort of the snakes. Kraits are oviparous, releasing a clutch of 12 to 14 eggs in piles of leaf litter. The female usually stays with them until they hatch.

== Venom ==
Bungarus contains some species that are among the most venomous land snakes in the world, to mice, based on their LD_{50}. They have a highly potent, neurotoxic venom, which can induce muscle paralysis. Clinically, their venom contains mostly presynaptic neurotoxins, which affect the ability of neuron endings to properly release a chemical communication mechanism to the next neuron. Following envenomation with bungarotoxins, transmitter release is initially blocked (leading to a brief paralysis), followed by a period of massive overexcitation (cramps, tremors, spasms), which finally tapers off to paralysis.

These phases of envenomation may or may not be experienced in all parts of the body; they may or may not be experienced simultaneously. The severity of the bite itself and the actual dosage of venom delivered plays a role in the intensity of symptoms. As kraits are mainly nocturnal, encounters with humans are rare during the daytime. Bites mainly occur after sunset, and are often (initially) painless; thus, a bite may go unnoticed if the victim is sleeping or otherwise does not see or notice the krait, further prolonging envenomation damage within the body. Still—whenever possible—medical treatment should be sought posthaste, as a bite from a krait is considered potentially life-threatening. All venomous snake bites must be taken seriously as an immediate medical emergency.

Typically, victims will start to notice severe abdominal cramps accompanied by progressive muscular paralysis, and frequently starting with ptosis. As no local symptoms are usually seen, a patient should be carefully observed for tell-tale signs of paralysis (e.g. the onset of bilateral ptosis, diplopia, and dysphagia), and subsequently treated (as quickly as possible) with antivenom. Frequently, little or no pain occurs at the site of a krait bite, which can provide false reassurance to the victim. The major medical difficulty of envenomated patients is the lack of medical resources (especially intubation supplies and mechanical ventilators in rural hospitals) and potential for ineffectiveness by the antivenom.

Upon arriving at a healthcare facility, support must be provided until the venom has metabolised and the victim can breathe unaided, especially if no species–specific antivenom is available. Given that the toxins alter acetylcholine transmission—which causes the paralysis—some patients have been successfully treated with cholinesterase inhibitors, such as physostigmine or neostigmine, but success is variable and may be species-dependent, as well. If death occurs, it typically takes place about 6–12 hours after the krait bite, but can be significantly delayed. The usual cause of death in that situation is respiratory failure—suffocation by complete paralysis of the diaphragm. Even if patients make it to a hospital, subsequently entering a permanent coma (and even brain death from hypoxia) may occur, given the potential for long transport times to get medical care, in some regions.

Mortality rates caused by bites from the members of this genus vary by species; according to University of Adelaide Department of Toxicology, bites from the banded krait have a mortality rate of 1–10% in untreated humans, while that of the common krait is 70–80%. In common with those of all other venomous snakes, the death time and fatality rate resulting from bites of kraits depend on numerous factors, such as the venom yield and the health status of the victim.

Polyvalent elapid antivenom is effective in neutralizing of the venoms of B. candidus and B. flaviceps, and rather effective for B. fasciatus, and the monovalent B. fasciatus antivenom is also moderately effective.

== Species ==
Image	Species	Authority	Subsp.*	Common name	Geographic range
	Bungarus andamanensis	Biswas & Sanyal, 1978	0	South Andaman krait	India (Andaman Island)
	Bungarus bungaroides	(Cantor, 1839)	0	Northeastern hill krait	Myanmar, India (Assam, Cachar, Sikkim), Nepal, Vietnam
	Bungarus caeruleus^{T}	(Schneider, 1801)	0	Common krait, Indian krait	Afghanistan, Pakistan, India (Bengal, Maharashtra, Karnataka), Sri Lanka, Bangladesh, Nepal
	Bungarus candidus	(Linnaeus, 1758)	0	Blue krait, Malayan krait	Cambodia, Indonesia (Java, Sumatra, Bali, Sulawesi), Malaysia (Malaya), Singapore, Thailand, Vietnam
	Bungarus ceylonicus	Günther, 1864	1	Ceylon krait, Sri Lankan krait	Sri Lanka
	Bungarus fasciatus	(Schneider, 1801)	0	Banded krait	Bangladesh, Brunei, Myanmar, Cambodia, south China (incl. Hong Kong, Hainan), north-east India, Bhutan, Nepal, Indonesia (Sumatra, Java, Borneo), Laos, Macau; Malaysia (Malaya and East Malaysia), Singapore, Thailand and Vietnam.
	Bungarus flaviceps	(Reinhardt, 1843)	1	Red-headed krait	South Thailand, South Myanmar, Cambodia, Vietnam, Malaysian Peninsula, Pulau Tioman, Indonesia (Bangka, Sumatra, Java, Billiton, Borneo)
	Bungarus lividus	Cantor, 1839	0	Lesser black krait	India, Bangladesh, Nepal
	Bungarus magnimaculatus	Wall & Evans, 1901	0	Burmese krait	Myanmar
	Bungarus multicinctus	Blyth, 1861	1	Many-banded krait	Taiwan, south China (Hong Kong, Hainan), Myanmar, Laos, northern Vietnam, and Thailand
	Bungarus niger	Wall, 1908	0	Black krait, Greater black krait	India (Assam, Sikkim), Nepal, Bangladesh, Bhutan
	Bungarus persicus	Abtin, Nilson, Mobaraki, Hosseini & Dehgannejhad, 2014	0	Persian krait, Iranian krait	Iran
	Bungarus sagittatus	Aksornneam, Rujirawan, Yodthong, Sung & Aowphol, 2024	0		Thailand
	Bungarus sindanus	Boulenger, 1897	2	Sind krait	Southeast Pakistan, India
	Bungarus slowinskii	Kuch, Kizirian, T.Q. Nguyen, Lawson, Donnelly & Mebs, 2005	0	Red River krait	Northern Vietnam, Thailand, Laos, Cambodia.
	Bungarus suzhenae	Chen, S.Shi, Vogel, Ding & J. Shi, 2021	0	Suzhen's krait	China (Yunnan), Myanmar (Kachin State)
	Bungarus walli	Wall, 1907	0	Wall's krait	India (Uttar Pradesh), Nepal, Bangladesh
	Bungarus wanghaotingi	Pope, 1928	0		China, Myanmar

*) Not including the nominate subspecies (typical form).
^{T}) Type species

Nota bene: A binomial authority in parentheses indicates that the species was originally described in a genus other than Bungarus.

== See also ==
- Locked-in syndrome
