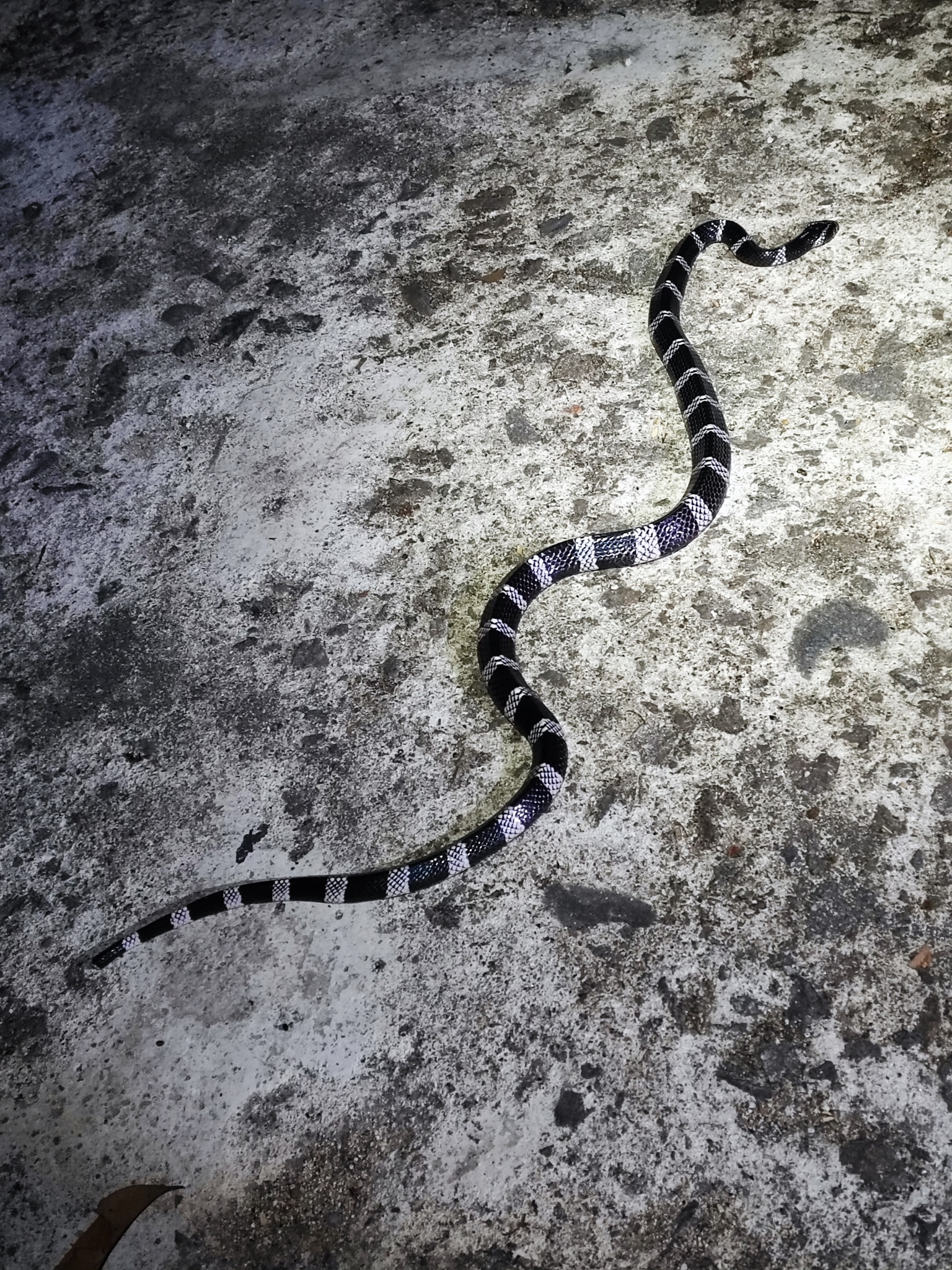

Conservation status
- Vulnerable (IUCN 3.1)

Scientific classification
- Kingdom: Animalia
- Phylum: Chordata
- Class: Reptilia
- Order: Squamata
- Suborder: Serpentes
- Family: Elapidae
- Genus: Bungarus
- Species: B. slowinskii

Binomial name
- Bungarus slowinskii Kuch et al., 2005
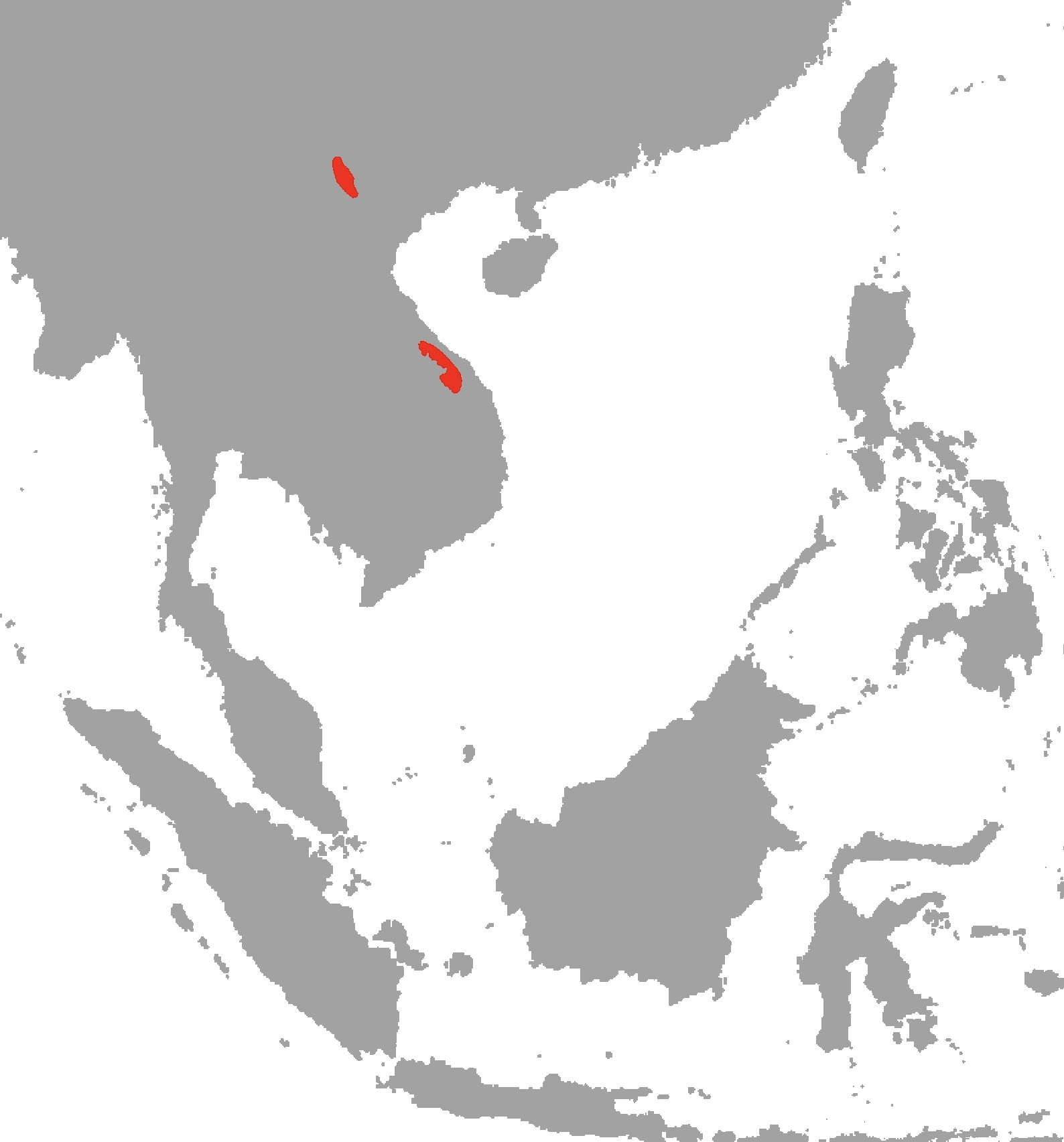

= Bungarus slowinskii =

Species of snake

Bungarus slowinskii, the Red River krait, is a species of venomous snake in the family Elapidae. The species is endemic to mainland Southeast Asia.

== Taxonomy ==
Ulrich Kuch and colleagues described the species in 2005. The specific name, slowinskii, honors Joseph Bruno Slowinski, an American herpetologist who died from a krait bite at age 38.

== Description ==
B. slowinskii has a color pattern of alternating wide black rings and narrow white rings on its body and tail. The dorsal scales are arranged in 15 rows at midbody. The dorsal scales in the vertebral row are enlarged and hexagonal. The subcaudal scales are divided.

== Distribution and habitat ==
B. slowinskii is currently known from Vietnam, northeastern Thailand, and Laos. The preferred natural habitat of B. slowinskii is forest, at altitudes of 400–700 m (1,300–2,300 ft).

== Reproduction ==
B. slowinskii is oviparous.
