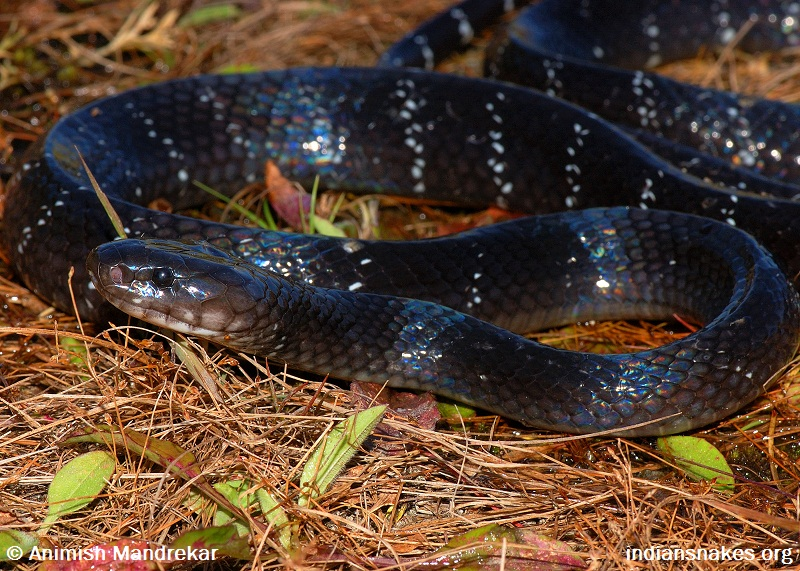

Conservation status
- Least Concern (IUCN 3.1)

Scientific classification
- Kingdom: Animalia
- Phylum: Chordata
- Class: Reptilia
- Order: Squamata
- Suborder: Serpentes
- Family: Elapidae
- Genus: Bungarus
- Species: B. bungaroides

Binomial name
- Bungarus bungaroides (Cantor, 1839)
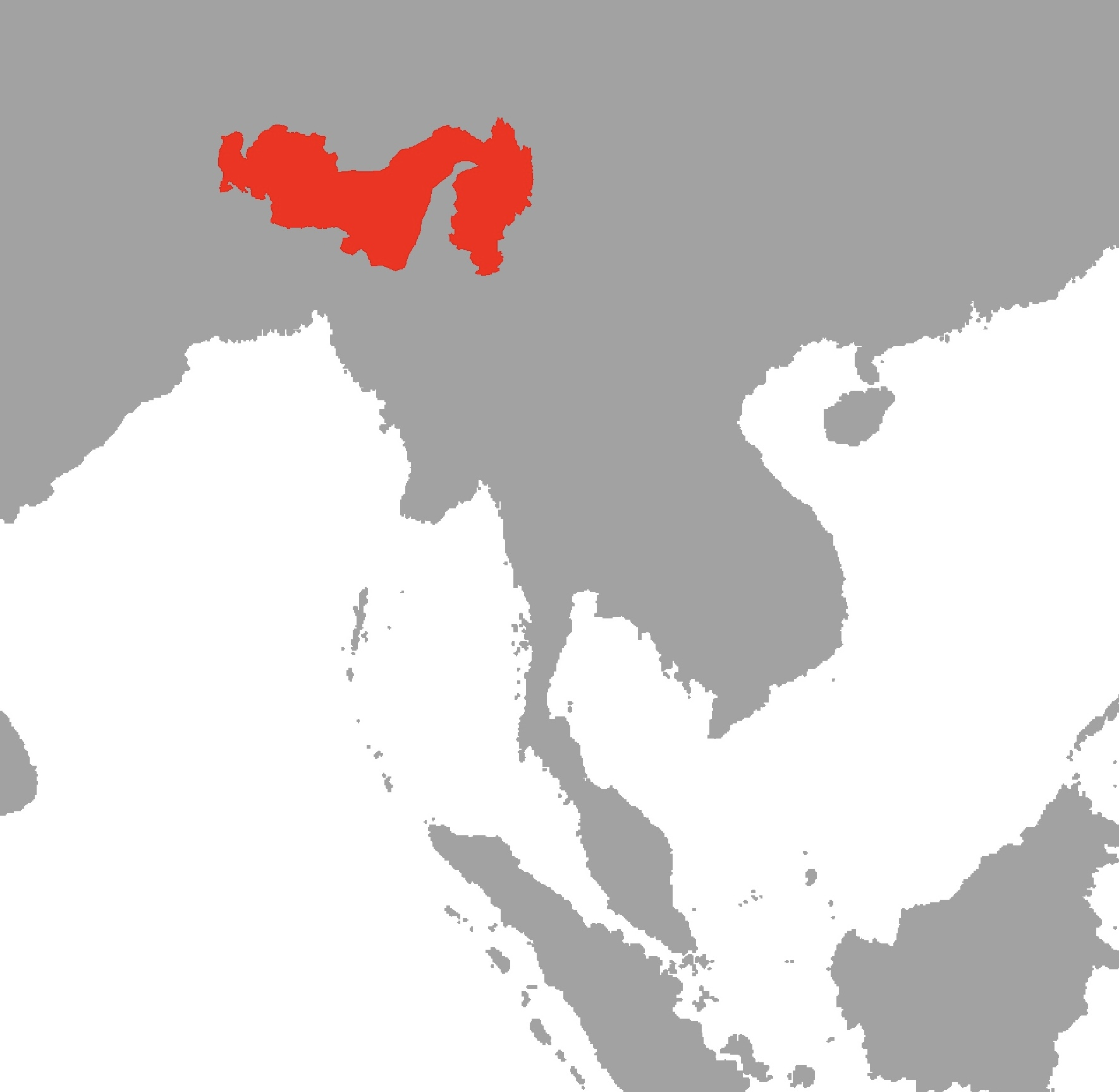

Synonyms
- Elaps bungaroides Cantor, 1839; Xenurelaps bungaroides – Günther, 1864; Bungarus bungaroides – Boulenger, 1890

= Bungarus bungaroides =

Species of snake

Bungarus bungaroides, the northeastern hill krait, is a venomous species of elapid snake.

== Description ==
This is a moderate- to large sized krait. Diagnostic characteristics include:

- Dorsal scales in 15 longitudinal rows at midbody. Mid-dorsal scales are slightly enlarged anteriorly, but distinctly enlarged posteriorly.
- Subcaudal scutes ordinarily divided anteriorly, but occasionally some scutes may be single, but always divided near the tip
- Ventrals 220–237; subcaudals 44–51
- Dorsum – smooth, black with a series of very narrow white to pale yellowish lines or crossbars; on the belly, the light crossbars widen to form distinct transverse bars
- head slightly distinct from the neck. Top of the head is flat. Snout is blunt.
- Total length of largest male 1400 mm (55 in); tail length 160 mm (6.3 in)

== Distribution and habitat ==
This species is found in Myanmar, India (Assam, Manipur, Cachar, Sikkim), Nepal, and Vietnam at elevations around 2040 m as well as in Tibet. The type locality is given as: "Cherra Punjee, Khasi Hills, Meghalaya, India".
