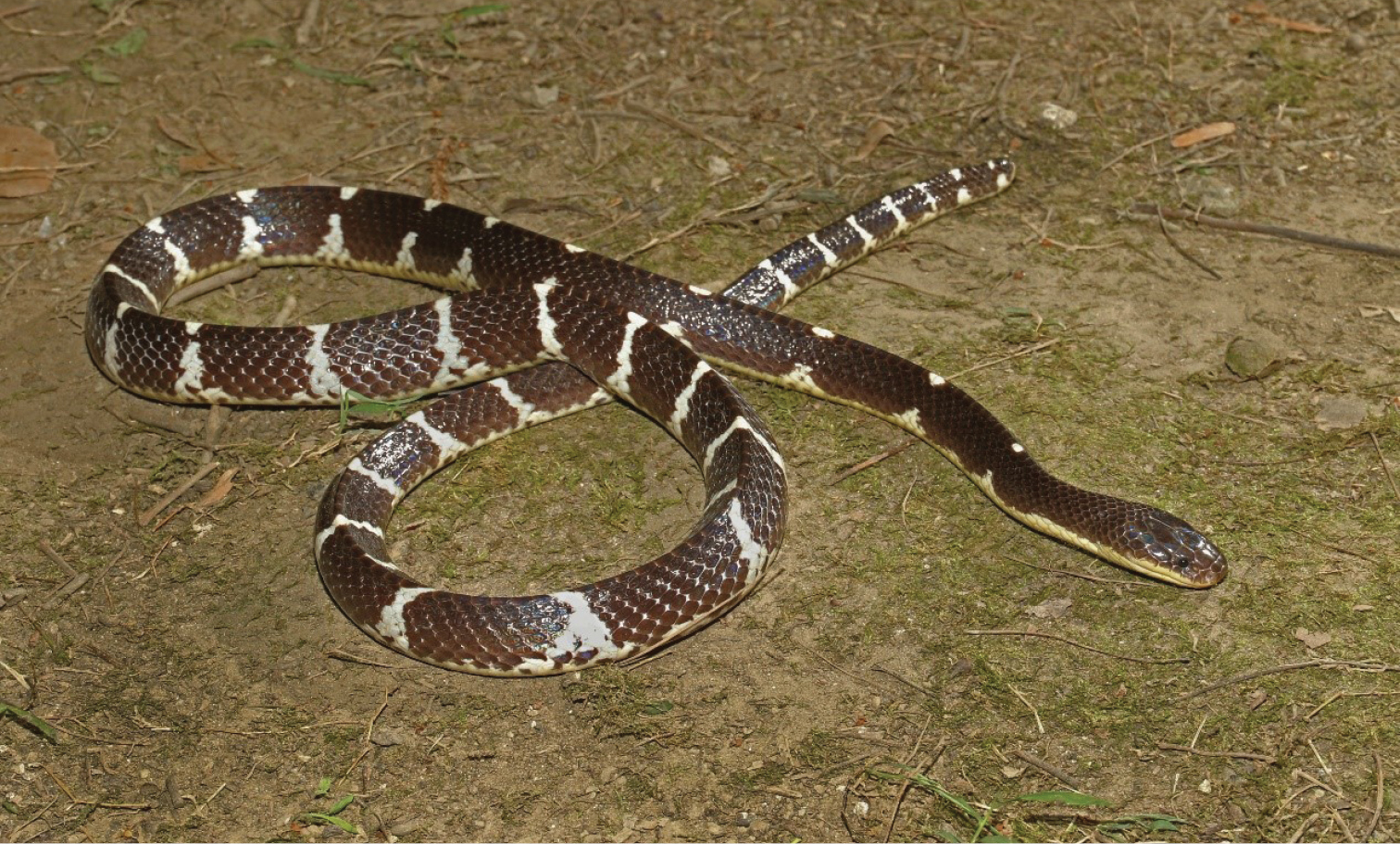
- Suzhen's krait (Adult female)

Scientific classification
- Kingdom: Animalia
- Phylum: Chordata
- Class: Reptilia
- Order: Squamata
- Suborder: Serpentes
- Family: Elapidae
- Genus: Bungarus
- Species: B. suzhenae

Binomial name
- Bungarus suzhenae Chen, Shi, Vogel, Ding & Shi, 2021

= Bungarus suzhenae =

Species of snake

Bungarus suzhenae, or Suzhen's krait, is a species of krait first described in the year 2021. The snake is named after Bai Suzhen, the snake goddess from the Chinese tale "Legend of the White Snake", who is revered as a deity of medicine, healing and true love. The Suzhen's krait is found in rice fields and streams in monsoon forests in southwestern China and northern Myanmar at elevations from 800 to 1,560 meters (2,620 to 5,120 ft) above sea level.

In 2001, famous herpetologist Joseph B. Slowinski died from a snakebite of this species, which was initially thought to be by an immature black-and-white banded krait, while leading an expedition team in northern Myanmar. The krait was identified as a new species of snake, following an examination of samples collected between 2016 and 2019 from Yingjiang County, Yunnan Province, China. This species is very dangerous, since kraits are potentially lethal, so understanding them is vital in saving human lives.

== Etymology ==
The specific epithet of the species was named after Bai Suzhen, a famous powerful snake goddess of Chinese myth The Legend of the White Snake (白蛇传), in honor of her courage to true love and kindness to people. The common name is suggested as "Suzhen's krait" in English and "素贞环蛇" (sùzhēn huánshé) in Chinese.

== Characteristics ==
Snakes of the genus Bungarus are of extreme significance medically and because all 14 species have black and white crossbands, and they are difficult to identify because of their overlapping characteristics in morphology. Suzhen's krait differs from other banded kraits in the shape of the crossbands, tail pattern, head pattern, mid body pattern, the maxilla teeth and hemipenial morphology.

=== Coloring ===
The dorsal surface of its head, the upper part of the sides of its head, including upper part of supralabials are uniform black. The lower half of its head, including the lower part of supralabials and rostral are yellowish-white. The ventral head is uniform yellowish-white and its iris is dark black.

== Diet ==
In captivity, B. suzhenae preys on eels like the Asian swamp eel (Monopterus albus) and small snakes such as the yellow-spotted keelback water snake (Xenochrophis flavipunctatus), but refuse mice and frogs.
