= Bungarus magnimaculatus =

Conservation status
- Least Concern (IUCN 3.1)

Scientific classification
- Kingdom: Animalia
- Phylum: Chordata
- Class: Reptilia
- Order: Squamata
- Suborder: Serpentes
- Family: Elapidae
- Genus: Bungarus
- Species: B. magnimaculatus

Binomial name
- Bungarus magnimaculatus Wall & Evans, 1901
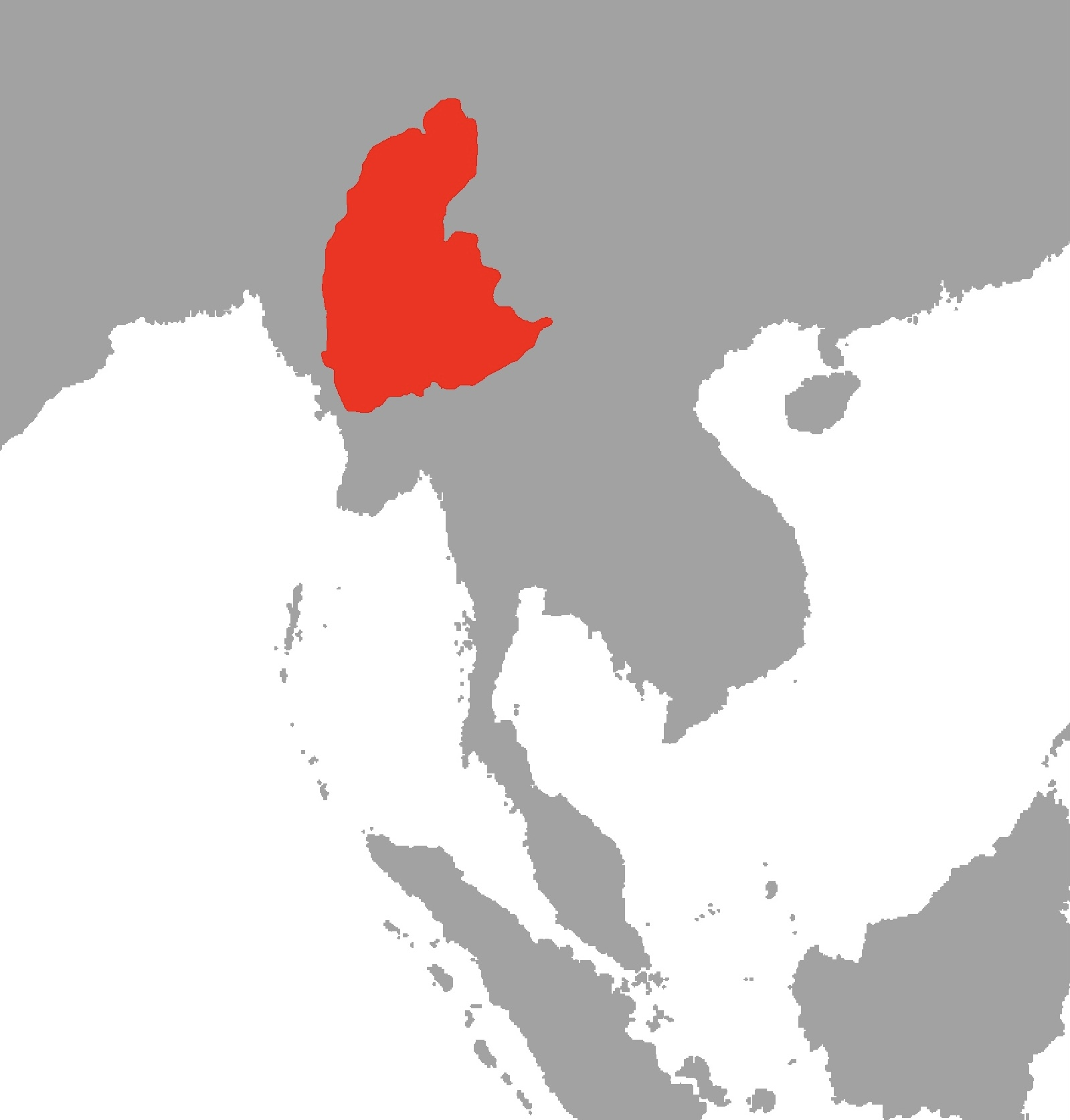

Synonyms
- Bungarus caeruleus var. magnimaculata Wall & Evans, 1901

Species of snake

Bungarus magnimaculatus, also known commonly as the Burmese krait, the spotted krait and the splendid krait, is a species of venomous snake in the family Elapidae. The species is endemic to Myanmar.

== Description ==
The Burmese krait is a medium-sized krait, typically approximately 1.1 m (3 ft 7 in) in total length, although some specimens may grow up to 1.3–1.45 m (4 ft 3 in – 4 ft 9 in). Like most kraits, it is a slender snake with a short tapering tail measuring around 150 mm (5.9 in). The head is flat and slightly distinct from the neck. The eyes of this species are generally small to medium in size with black round pupils. Dorsal scales are smooth and glossy with the vertebral row enlarged and hexagonal. The body of this species is triangular shaped in cross-sections. The dorsum has from 11 to 14 broad, white crossbars, which are as wide as the black interspaces. The centers of the white scales may be spotted with black. The belly of the Burmese krait is uniformly white in colour.

== Distribution and habitat ==
B. magnimaculatus is understood to be endemic to Myanmar. It can be found in Mandalay, Sagaing, and Magway divisions of Myanmar. It might also occur in adjacent areas of Yunnan Province in China, Thailand, Laos, Bangladesh and/or northeastern parts of India, but it has not yet been observed in any of them.

The type locality of this species is Meiktila, in Upper Myanmar in the Mandalay Division which lies in seasonal dry forest; thus, this species is likely to occur throughout the central dry zone. It occurs in dry tropical lowland forest. Specimens have been located in disturbed habitats close to plantations and villages. This species can be found from near sea level to elevations reaching 1,000 m (3,300 ft).

== Behaviour ==
B. magnimaculatus is a terrestrial species of snake that is active at night, being a nocturnal in nature. The disposition of this species is placid and shy, often coiling loosely and hiding its head beneath its body when molested or threatened. It is very disinclined to bite unless persistently provoked.

== Prey ==
The Burmese krait preys predominantly on other species of snakes, but it still occasionally does take small mammals such as rats and mice, lizards, frogs, and even fish.

== Venom ==
Very little is known about the venom of B. magnimaculatus. Like other species of krait, the venom is potent and contains both pre-synaptic and post-synaptic neurotoxins. There is no known antivenom for bites by this species. Bites of humans by this species are exceptionally rare, therefore no well-documented cases of human fatalities have been attributed to this species.
