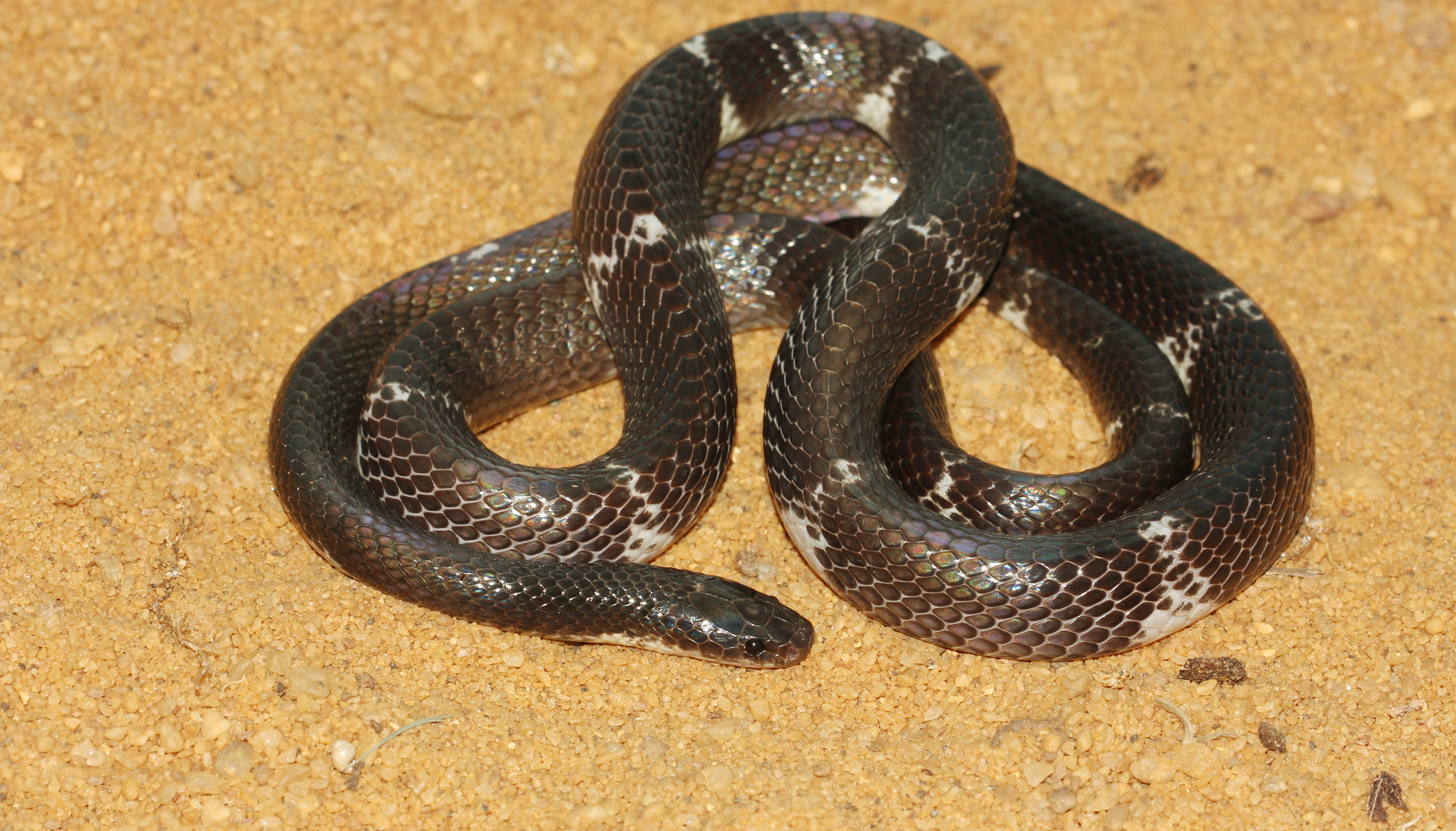

Conservation status
- Near Threatened (IUCN 3.1)

Scientific classification
- Kingdom: Animalia
- Phylum: Chordata
- Class: Reptilia
- Order: Squamata
- Suborder: Serpentes
- Family: Elapidae
- Genus: Bungarus
- Species: B. ceylonicus

Binomial name
- Bungarus ceylonicus Günther, 1864
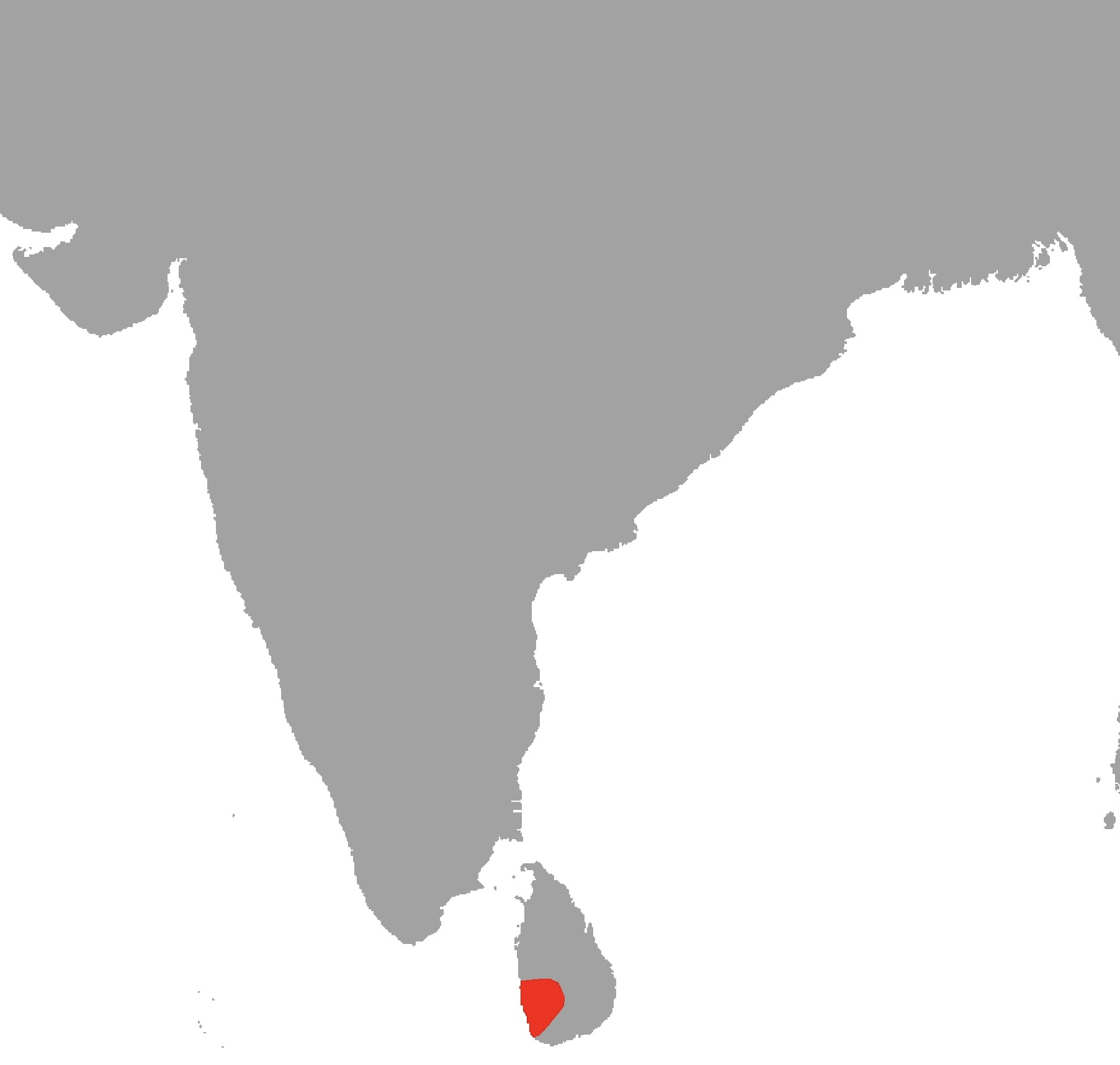

= Bungarus ceylonicus =

Species of snake

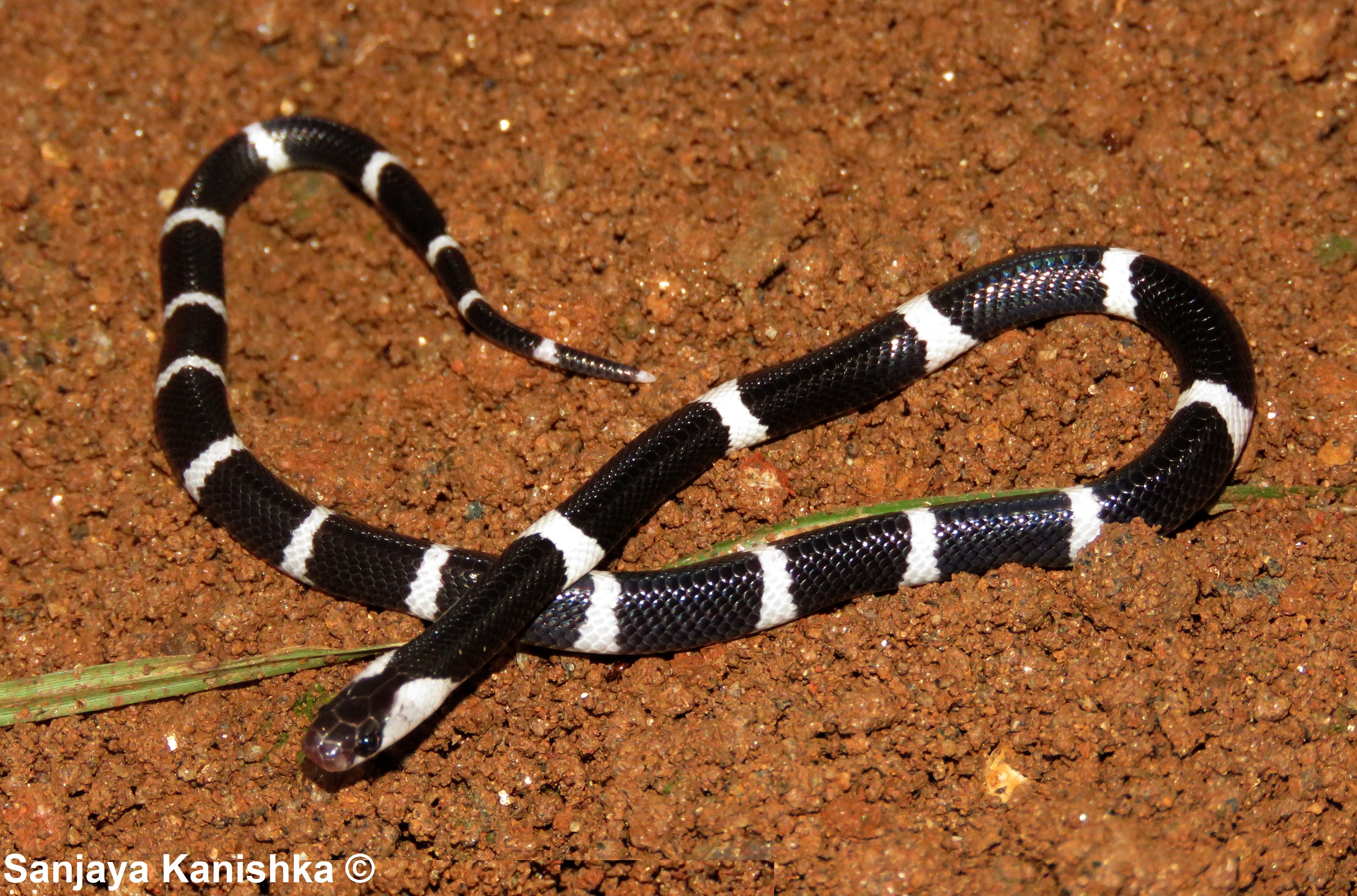
A juvenile Ceylon krait with prominent banding

Bungarus ceylonicus, the Ceylon krait or Sri Lankan krait, is a species of venomous elapid snake which is endemic to the island Sri Lanka, locally known as මුදු කරවලා (mudu karawalaa).

== Description ==
The Sri Lankan krait is small and slender. On hatching, the length of the snake is about 250 mm (9.8 in). The average adult length for this species is 75 cm (29 1/2 in) with 90 cm (35 1/2 in) being the upper limit. Its black skin is crossed with thin white transverse bands. It has an extraordinarily long lung which it inflates when angry.

== Distribution and habitat ==
The species is principally present in the wet zone of Sri Lanka at elevations up to 1,700 m, with infrequent presence in the dry zone, and occurs in forest habitats as well as gardens and plantations.

== Ecology ==
The species is nocturnal, and sluggish by day. Its diet consists mainly of small mammals, frogs and other snakes. The krait is oviparous, laying cylindrical eggs with rounded ends that measure 30 mm x 17 mm.
