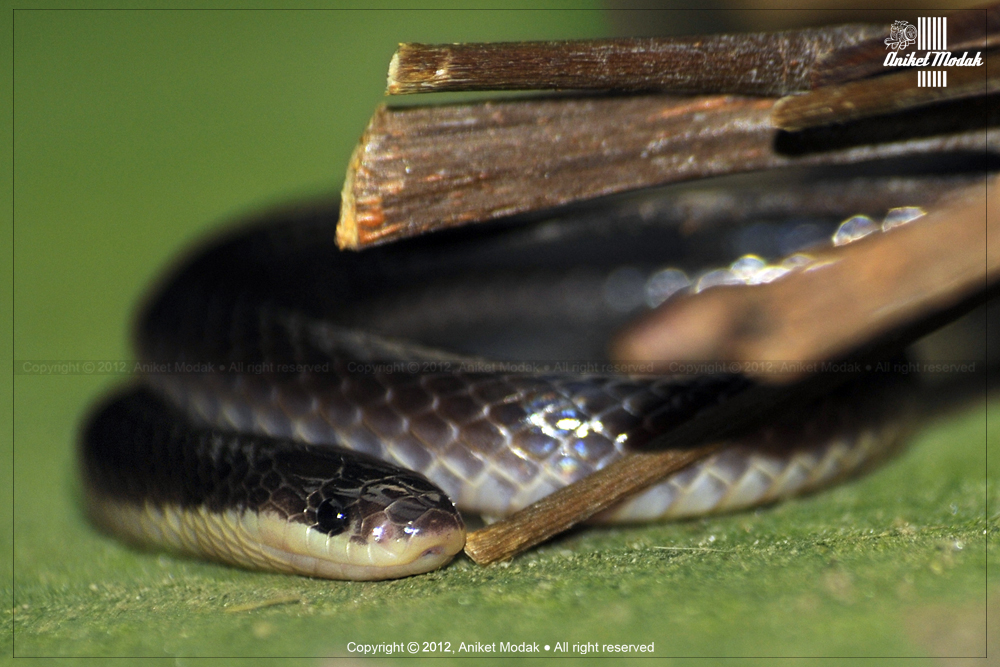

Conservation status
- Least Concern (IUCN 3.1)

Scientific classification
- Kingdom: Animalia
- Phylum: Chordata
- Class: Reptilia
- Order: Squamata
- Suborder: Serpentes
- Family: Elapidae
- Genus: Bungarus
- Species: B. niger

Binomial name
- Bungarus niger Wall, 1908
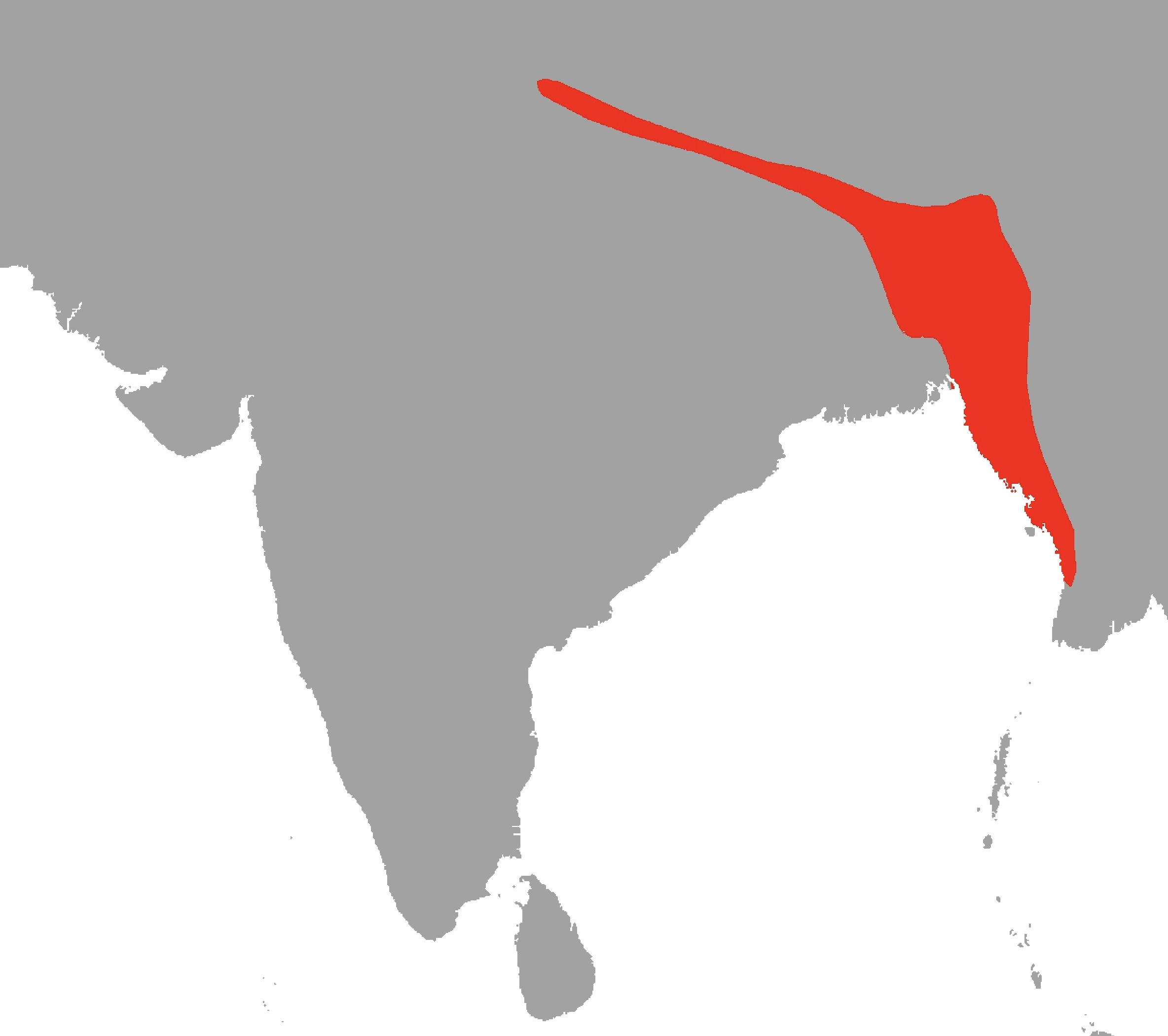

= Greater black krait =

Species of snake

The greater black krait (Bungarus niger) or black krait, is a species of krait, a venomous snake in the genus Bungarus of the family Elapidae. The species is endemic to South Asia.

== Description ==
Bungarus niger is medium in length, slender-bodied, and triangular in cross-section, with a short, pointed tail. It can grow to a maximum total length (including tail) of about 1.3 m (4.3 ft), but adults usually average around 0.8 m (2.6 ft).

- Colouration: The eyes are black; The tongue is pinkish with a lighter tip.; Upper and lower labials, chin and anterior part of the venter are whitish. Dorsally it is shiny black, interscale colouration is whitish. The venter is creamy white with black edges, which increases posteriorly from midbody.
- The head is flat and slightly distinct from the neck.
- The eyes are small to medium in size, with a round pupil.
- The dorsal scales are smooth and glossy, with scales of the vertebral row enlarged and hexagonal. The dorsal scale count is 15 - 15 - 15. It is syntopic with the lesser black krait (Bungarus lividus), but can be separated by the enlarged dorsal vertebral scales. The scales are smooth and without apical pits.
- The number of ventral and subcaudals are higher than in all other Bungarus species (216–231 ventrals and 47–57 subcaudals).

== Distribution and habitat ==
Bungarus niger is found in Northeast and North India (Assam, Sikkim, Arunachal Pradesh, Uttarakhand), Nepal, Bhutan, and Bangladesh, recently sighting in Jharkhand (Bokaro). The species was described by Frank Wall from a specimen obtained from near Tindharia near Darjeeling. The species is also found at Jalpaiguri town and other parts of the district. This species inhabits a wide variety of habitats from mangrove swamps to inhabited villages to montane forests up to elevations of 1,500 m (4,900 ft) above sea level on the Himalayan foothills. It is often encountered in the tea gardens of the northeastern India.

== Behavior and ecology ==
A nocturnal and terrestrial snake, B. niger has an inoffensive disposition. When disturbed, it coils loosely and hides its head beneath its body. It is reluctant to bite except upon persistent provocation. It preys mostly on snakes and small mammals and occasionally lizards, frogs, and fish.

== Venom ==
The venom of B. niger consists of both presynaptic and postsynaptic neurotoxins, and may also contain myotoxins. This snake is often overlooked, but it is a medically important species, as it has caused many bites. The mortality rate associated with it is not known, but is said to be quite high.
