= Bungarus persicus =

Scientific classification
- Kingdom: Animalia
- Phylum: Chordata
- Class: Reptilia
- Order: Squamata
- Suborder: Serpentes
- Family: Elapidae
- Genus: Bungarus
- Species: B. persicus

Binomial name
- Bungarus persicus Abtin et al., 2014

Species of snake

Bungarus persicus is a species of snake of the family Elapidae.

B. persicus does not have a listed IUCN conservation status. B. persicus is a species of krait and member of the Elapidae family documented in southern and southeastern Baluchistan, Iran.

== Description ==
B. persicus is described by several key traits. B. persicus has 17 dorsal midbody scales, its vertebral row of scales is enlarged, and it has 236-238 ventral plates and 50-53 subcaudal plates.The prenasal penetrates between the rostral and first supralabial; nearly reaching the edge of the mouth. The loreal plate on both sides posterior to the nostril is small and has no loreal division. Its coloration is mostly black with 25 light triangular pairs of crossbars, two light triangular spots on each side of the neck. Each triangular pair ends in pairs of rectangular white dots. There are also three cross bars on the tail. The head is black above and yellowish white below, with a sharp border between the colors superior to the supralabials. The belly is the same yellowish white as described on the head. Hemipene characteristics are not yet described.
