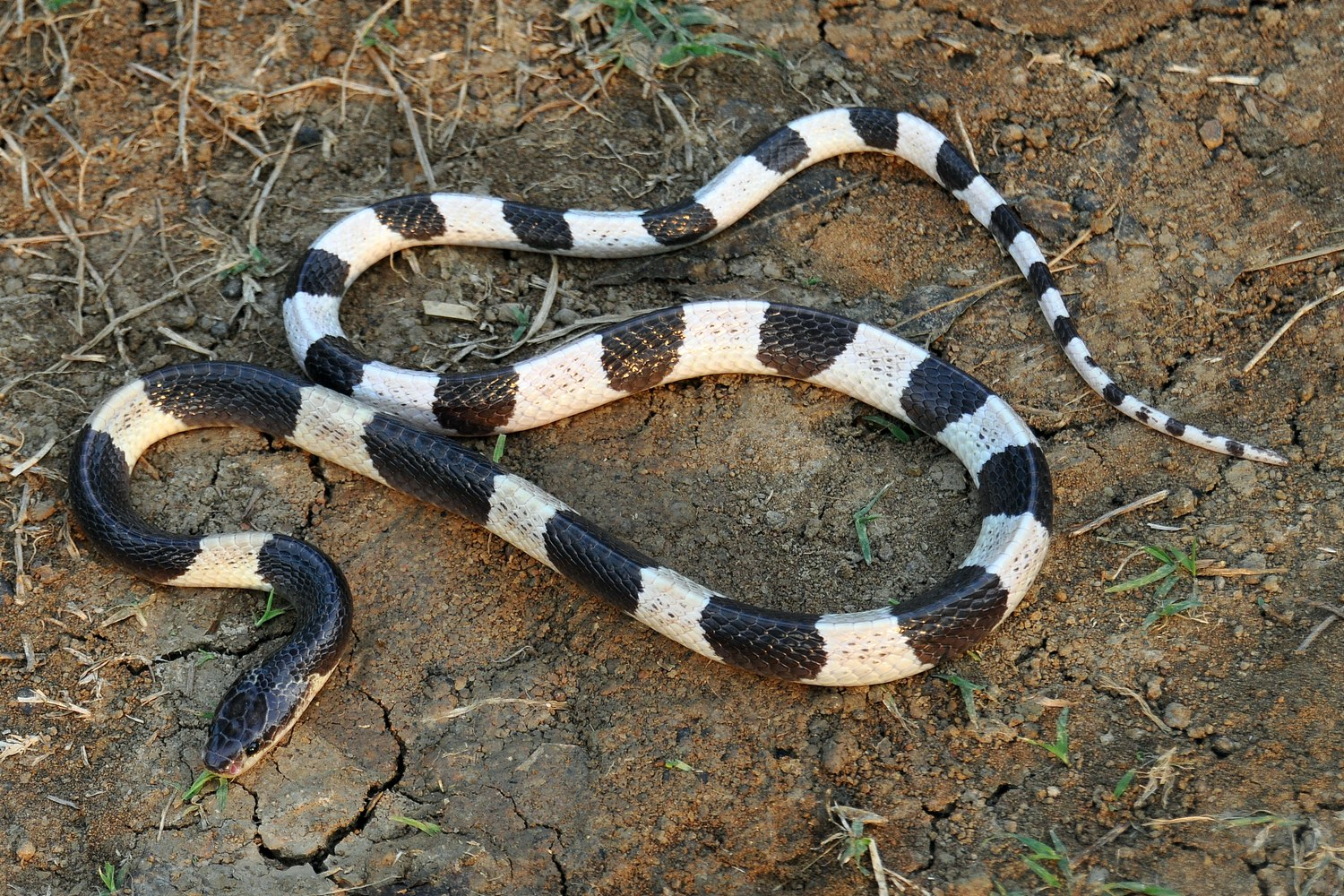
- From Karawang, West Java, Indonesia

Conservation status
- Least Concern (IUCN 3.1)

Scientific classification
- Kingdom: Animalia
- Phylum: Chordata
- Class: Reptilia
- Order: Squamata
- Suborder: Serpentes
- Family: Elapidae
- Genus: Bungarus
- Species: B. candidus

Binomial name
- Bungarus candidus (Linnaeus, 1758)
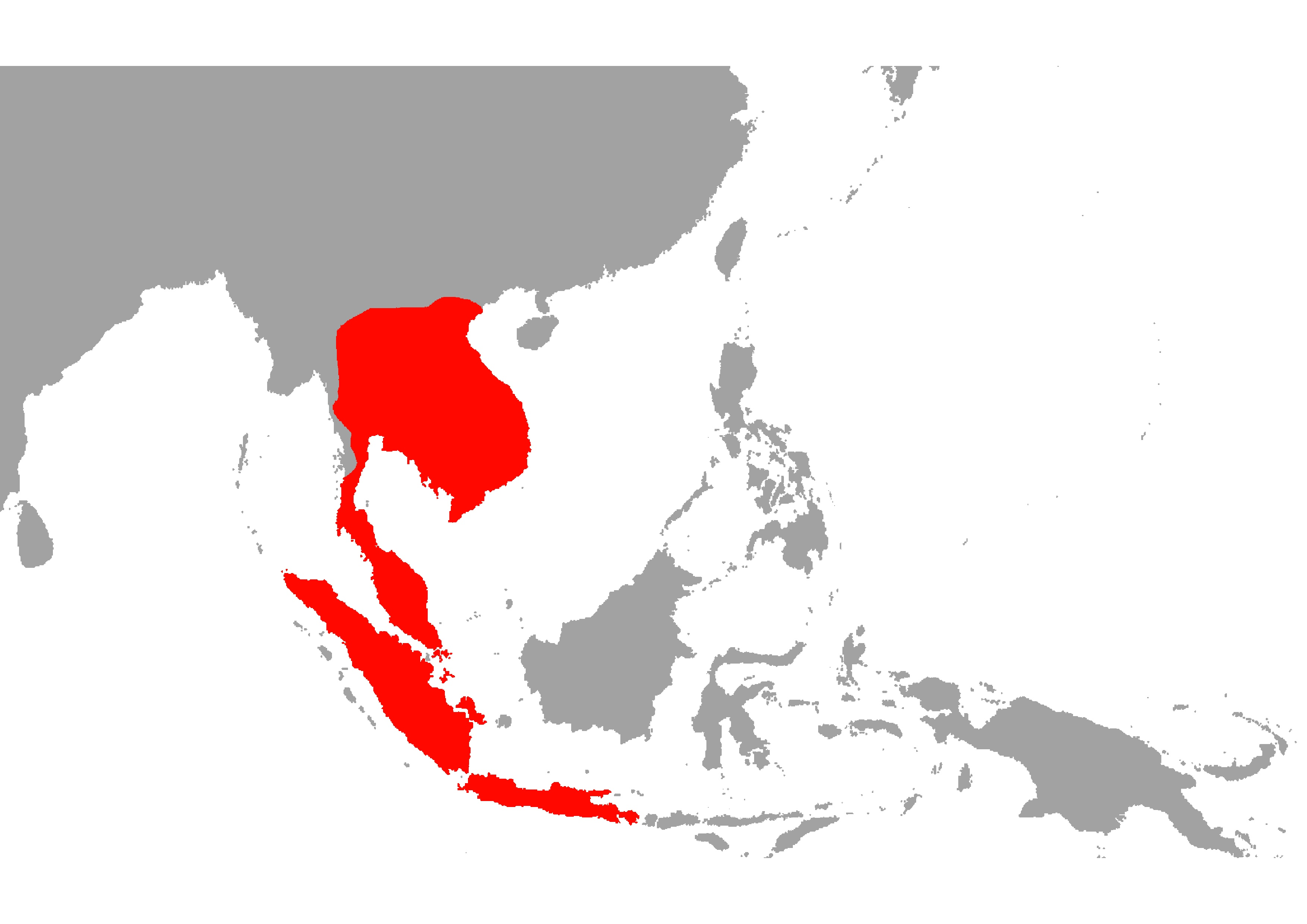

Synonyms
- Coluber candidus Linnaeus, 1758

= Bungarus candidus =

Species of snake

Bungarus candidus, commonly known as the Malayan krait or blue krait, is an extremely venomous species of snake. The blue krait is a member of the genus Bungarus and the family Elapidae.

== Description ==
The Malayan krait may attain a total length of 108 cm (43 in), with a tail 16 cm (6.3 in) long.

Dorsally, it has a pattern of 27–34 dark-brown, black, or bluish-black crossbands on the body and tail, which are narrowed and rounded on the sides. The first crossband is continuous with the dark color of the head. The dark crossbands are separated by broad, yellowish-white interspaces, which may be spotted with black. Ventrally, it is uniformly white.

An unbanded black phenotype also occurs in some populations, reportedly in West and Central Java.

The smooth dorsal scales are arranged in 15 rows, with the vertebral row much enlarged. The ventrals number 195–237; the anal plate is entire; and the single (undivided) subcaudals are 37–56 in number.

== Distribution and habitat ==
It is found in Southeast Asia from Indochina south to Java and Bali in Indonesia.

== Venom ==
In mice, the intravenous LD_{50} for this species is 0.1 mg/kg. Its mortality rate is 60–70% in untreated humans. The amount of venom injected is 5 mg, while the lethal dose for a 75kg human is 1 mg.

Like many members of the genus Bungarus, the venom of the Malayan krait is highly neurotoxic. The major components of the venom are notably three-finger toxins (3FTxs) and Kunitz-type inhibitors. These toxins as reported can mostly trigger progressive neuromuscular paralysis leading to respiratory failure and in some cases, cardiovascular interruptions like hypertension and shock.
