= Joseph Bruno Slowinski =

American herpetologist

- Born: November 15, 1962
- Died: September 12, 2001 (aged 38)
- Occupation: herpetologist

Joseph Bruno Slowinski (November 15, 1962 – September 12, 2001) was an American herpetologist who worked extensively with elapid snakes.

== Research and career ==
Slowinski was born on November 15, 1962, in New York City, New York. He attained his bachelor's degree in biology from the University of Kansas in 1984 and went on to receive his Ph.D. at the University of Miami in 1991, studying under herpetologist Jay M. Savage. He performed postdoctoral work at the National Museum of Natural History and Louisiana State University, eventually taking a position as a professor of biology at Southeastern Louisiana University.

Slowinski was a founder of the first online herpetological journal, Contemporary Herpetology, and served as its editor-in-chief. He was also the curator for the Department of Herpetology for the California Academy of Sciences. His primary area of research was venomous snakes, having written some 40 peer-reviewed articles and one book.

== Death and legacy ==
On September 11, 2001, while researching in Rat Baw, an isolated far north region of Myanmar, Slowinski was bitten by a Suzhen's krait (Bungarus suzhenae) after reaching into a specimen bag that his Burmese field assistant, U Htun Win, held out saying, “I think it’s a Dinodon,” a nonvenomous krait lookalike. This fatal incident could have easily been blamed on Win, the field leader, who should have known there was a krait in the bag, but he said he was bitten by the same snake only a day before without consequence. In the book, The Snake Charmer, there are different accounts of the fatal bite incident that complicate the story behind the accident, including one in which there were two snakes in the bag: the lookalike that had bitten Win, and the krait that envenomated Joe.

Slowinski died 29 hours later after his team, which included Mark W. Moffett, made several failed attempts to obtain medical attention. The September 11 terrorist attacks made communication with the embassy difficult, and by the time the embassy prepared a helicopter, the weather was particularly bad, thus preventing a helicopter from transporting Slowinski to a hospital, and making it impossible to carry medical supplies to the campsite.

A biography of Slowinski titled The Snake Charmer was written in 2008 by Jamie James.

Three species have been named after Slowinski: a species of North American corn snake (Pantherophis slowinskii), a species of bent-toed gecko native to Myanmar (Cyrtodactylus slowinskii), and a species of krait native to Vietnam (Bungarus slowinskii).

== Bibliography ==
- Introduction to Genetics, 1998 – National Textbook Company, Lincolnwood, Illinois.
