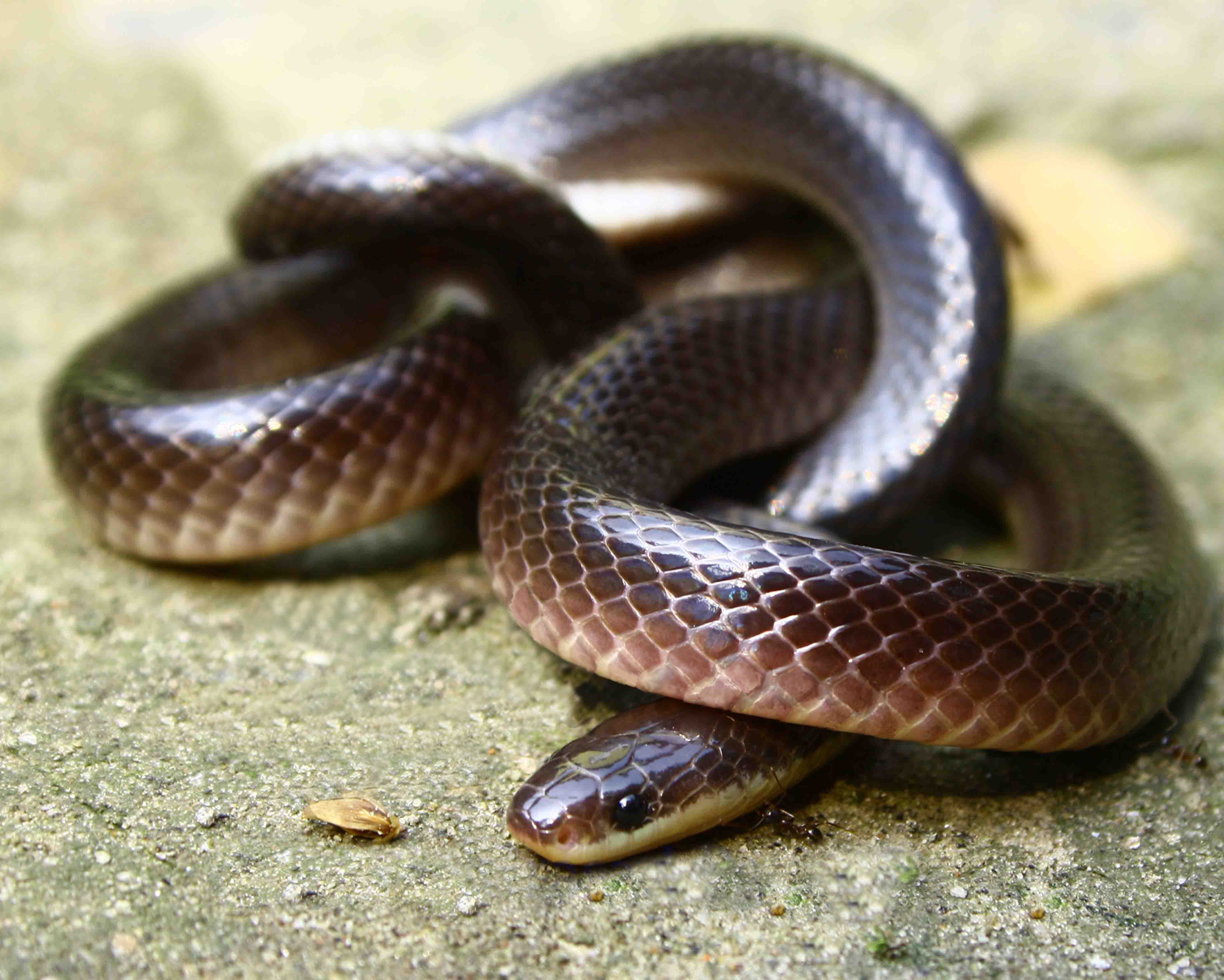

Conservation status
- Least Concern (IUCN 3.1)

Scientific classification
- Kingdom: Animalia
- Phylum: Chordata
- Class: Reptilia
- Order: Squamata
- Suborder: Serpentes
- Family: Elapidae
- Genus: Bungarus
- Species: B. lividus

Binomial name
- Bungarus lividus Cantor, 1839
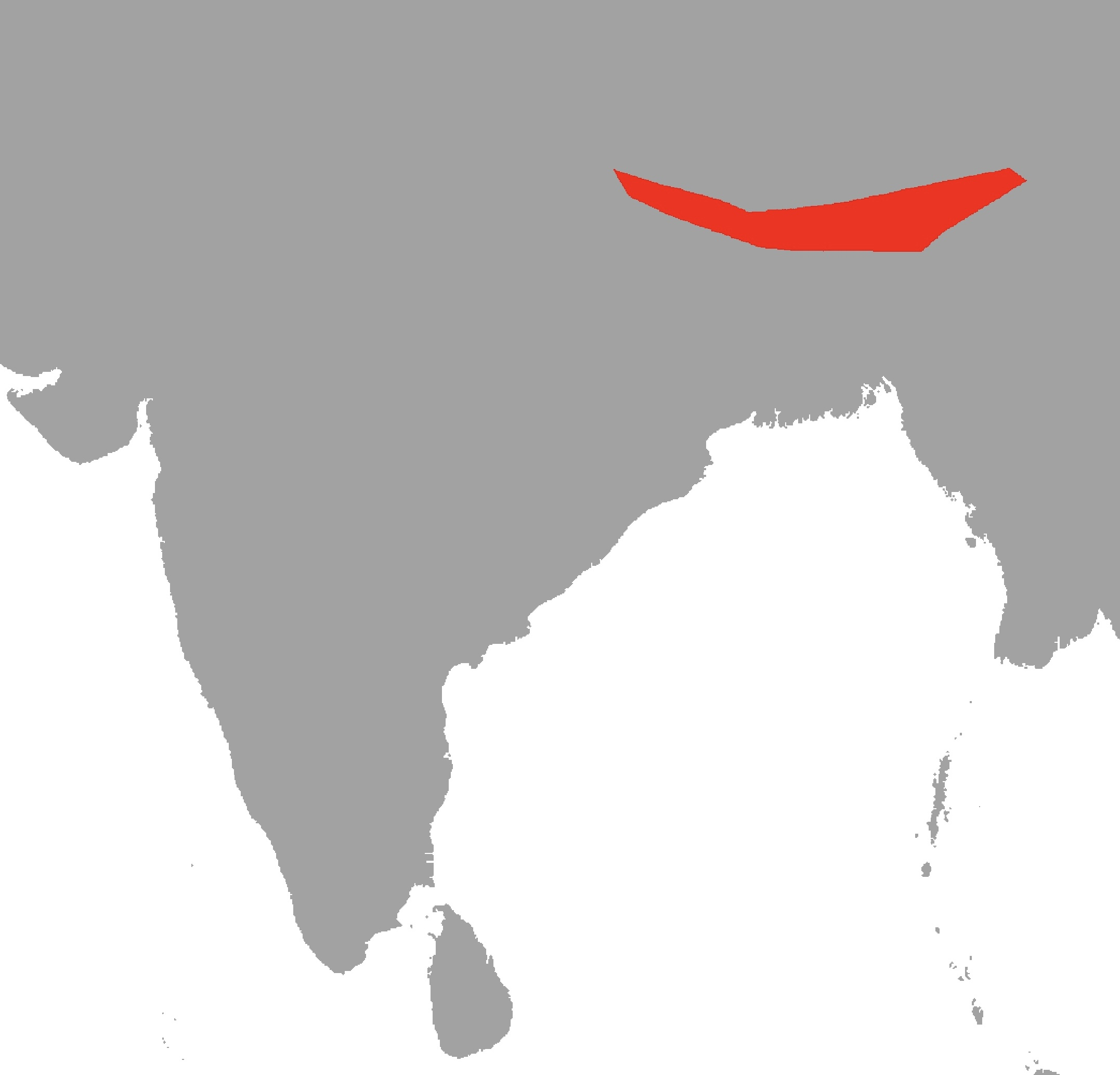

= Lesser black krait =

Species of snake

The lesser black krait (Bungarus lividus) is a species of venomous elapid snake found in India, Bangladesh, and Nepal. The specific epithet is after Latin lividus, meaning "bluish metal-colored" or "lead-colored", referring to the snake's coloration.

== Description ==
The lesser black krait is a rather small snake. The body (dorsum) is smooth and black to bluish-black in colour. The upper lip is white. The ventrals are white with grey edges. The eyes are small, black with round pupils. Eyes are positioned more towards the snout. The scales are arranged in 15 dorsal rows (15:15:15). The mid-dorsal (vertebral) scales are only slightly enlarged than the other rows. Anal and subcaudal scales are undivided. 7 supralabials (3rd and 4th touches eye), 7 infralabials (3rd touches anterior genial); Temporals 1+2; Postocular 2.

== Distribution ==
India(North Bengal, Northeast India), Bangladesh, Nepal

Type locality: Assam, India

== Ecology ==
=== Feeding ===
The krait is primarily ophiophagous, meaning it preys on other snakes.
