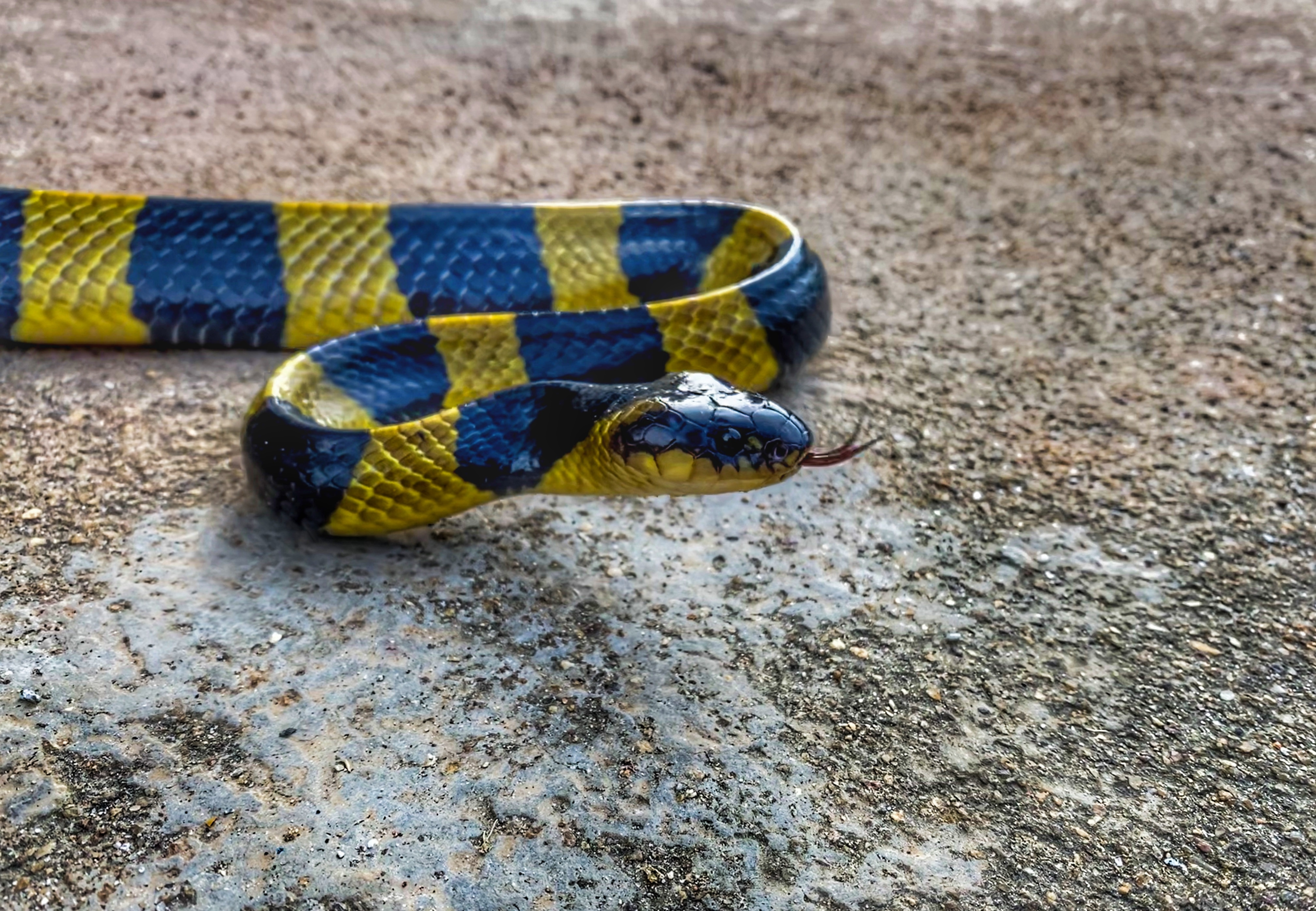
- Banded krait

Conservation status
- Least Concern (IUCN 3.1)

Scientific classification
- Kingdom: Animalia
- Phylum: Chordata
- Class: Reptilia
- Order: Squamata
- Suborder: Serpentes
- Family: Elapidae
- Genus: Bungarus
- Species: B. fasciatus

Binomial name
- Bungarus fasciatus (Schneider, 1801)

Synonyms
- Pseudoboa fasciata Schneider, 1801; Boa fasciata - Shaw, 1802; Bungarus annularis - Daudin, 1803

= Banded krait =

Species of Asian elapid snake

The banded krait (Bungarus fasciatus) is a venomous species of elapid endemic to Asia, from the Indian subcontinent through Southeast Asia to Southern China. With a maximum length exceeding 2 m (6 ft 7 in), it is the longest krait with a distinguishable gold and black pattern. While this species is generally considered timid and docile, resembling other members of the genus, its venom is highly neurotoxic which is lethal to humans. Although toxicity of the banded krait based upon murine LD_{50} experiments is lower than that of many other kraits, its venom yield is the highest due to its size.

== Description ==
The banded krait is easily identified by its alternate black and yellow crossbands all of which encircle the body. The head is broad and depressed and it is not distinct from the neck. The eyes are black. It has arrowhead-like yellow markings on its otherwise black head and has yellow lips, lores, chin, and throat. The tail is relatively small, about one-tenth the length of the snake.

The longest banded krait measured was 2.25 m (7 ft 5 in) long, but normally the length encountered is 1.8 m (5 ft 11 in).

Scalation: 15 dorsal scale rows at midbody; sub-caudal scutes undivided throughout, 23–39; middorsal row of scales (vertebrals) hexagonal and strongly enlarged, as broad as or broader than long; anal plate undivided. tail end blunt; distinct vertebral ridge down the back formed by the neural processes of the vertebrae; ventrals 200–234.

Bungarum Pamah was the name recorded by Patrick Russell of a specimen from "Mansoor Cottah", he also received specimens from Bengal. The scientific name of the genus is derived from bangarum in Telugu (also in Kannada), meaning "gold", referring to the yellow rings around its body.

== Distribution and habitat ==
The banded krait occurs in the whole of the Indo-Chinese subregion, the Malay Peninsula and Indonesian archipelago, and southern China. The species is common in the states of West Bengal, Odisha, Mizoram, Assam, Manipur, Bihar and Tripura of India, Nepal and Bangladesh, but becomes progressively uncommon westwards in India.

It has been recorded eastwards from central India through Nepal, Bangladesh, Myanmar, Cambodia, Thailand, Laos, Vietnam, and southern China (including Hainan and Hong Kong), Malaysia and the main Indonesian islands of Borneo (Java and Sumatra), as well as Singapore.

In India, it has been recorded from Andhra Pradesh, Bihar, Chhattisgarh, Jharkhand, Madhya Pradesh, Maharashtra, Northeast India, Odisha, Tamil Nadu, Kerala and West Bengal. It has recently been recorded from Hassan District in Karnataka, Chalkari, Bokaro District, Jharkhand, Trivandrum, Kerala and Amalapadu, Srikakulam District, Andhra Pradesh Supaul district, Bihar.

Banded kraits may be seen in a variety of habitats, ranging from forests to agricultural lands. They inhabit termite mounds and rodent holes close to water, and often live near human settlement, especially villages, because of their supply of rodents and water. They prefer the open plains of the countryside. The banded krait has been found in Myanmar up to an altitude of 5,000 feet (1,500 m).

== Behaviour ==
Banded kraits are shy, not typically seen, and are mainly nocturnal. When harassed, they will usually hide their heads under their coils, and do not generally attempt to bite, though at night they are much more active and widely considered to be more dangerous then.

During the day, they lie up in grass, pits, or drains. The snakes are lethargic and sluggish even under provocation. They are most commonly seen in the rains.

=== Food ===
The banded krait feeds mainly on other snakes, but is also known to eat fish, frogs, skinks, and snake eggs. Among the snakes taken by banded kraits are:

- Sunbeam snake Xenopeltis unicolor
- Rainbow water snake Enhydris enhydris
- Red-tailed pipe snake Cylindrophis ruffus
- Chequered keelback Fowlea piscator
- Buff-striped keelback Amphiesma stolatum
- Rat snake or dhaman Ptyas mucosus
- Indo-Chinese rat snake Ptyas korros
- Cat snake Boiga trigonata.
- Russell's viper (Daboia russelii)
- Common krait (Bungarus caeruleus)

The prey is swallowed head first, after it has been rendered inactive by the venom.

=== Breeding habits ===
Little is known of its breeding habits. In Myanmar, a female has been dug out while incubating a clutch of eight eggs, four of which hatched in May. Young have been recorded to measure 298 to 311 mm on hatching. The snake is believed to become adult in the third year of its life, at an approximate length of 914 mm.

== Venom ==
The venom of the banded krait mainly contains neurotoxins (pre- and postsynaptic neurotoxins) with LD_{50} values of 2.4 mg/kg–3.6 mg/kg SC, 1.289 mg/kg IV and 1.55 mg/kg IP. The quantity of venom delivered averages out at 20–114 mg. Engelmann and Obst (1981) list the venom yield at 114 mg (dry weight). The major clinical effects caused by the venom of this species include vomiting, abdominal pain, diarrhoea, and dizziness. Severe envenomation can lead to respiratory failure and death may occur due to suffocation. Banded krait venom can damage the kidneys if injected.

A clinical toxicology study gives an untreated mortality rate of 1–10%, which may be because contact with humans is rare and when bites do occur, the rate of envenomation when biting defensively is thought to be very low. Currently, polyvalent antivenoms are available in India and Indonesia.

== Common names ==
- Manipuri language – linkhak
- Mizo language – chawnglei, tiangsir
- Kannada – kattige haavu (ಕಟ್ಟಿಗೆ ಹಾವು)
- Karbi language – maipam, rui-teron
- Assamese language – xokha (শখা), xongkhosur (শংখচোৰ), gowala (গোৱালা), bandphora
- Bengali – shankhini (শঙ্খিনী), shankhamooti shaanp (শাঁখামুঠি) and rajsap (king snake) in Birbhum District কুসাপা (রাজবংশি ভাষায়)
- Burmese – ငန်းတော်ကျား ngān taw kyā
- Hindi – ahiraaj saamp
- Indonesian – welang
- Ho – Sakombiń
- Malayalam – manjavarayan (മഞ്ഞവരയൻ)
- Marathi – patteri manyar, पट्टेरी मण्यार agya manyar, sataranjya
- Odia – rana (ରଣା)
- Tamil – kattu viriyan (கட்டுவிரியன்), yennai viriyan, yettadi viriyan
- Telugu – katla paamu (కట్ల పాము) or bangaru paamu (బంగారు పాము) meaning the golden snake
- Tulu – kadambale
- Thai – ngu sam liam, งูสามเหลี่ยม, meaning the triangular snake
- Vietnamese – rắn cạp nong
- Nepali – गनगलि, गनग्वली, राजा साप वा सर्प gangali, gan gwali and Rajasaap (king of snakes) in Nepal
- Maithili – मैथिली – गन गुआर

== Gallery ==
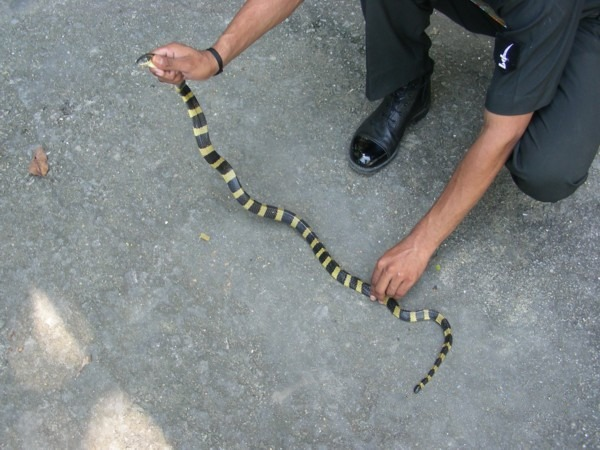
Banded krait captured in Binnaguri, North Bengal, India

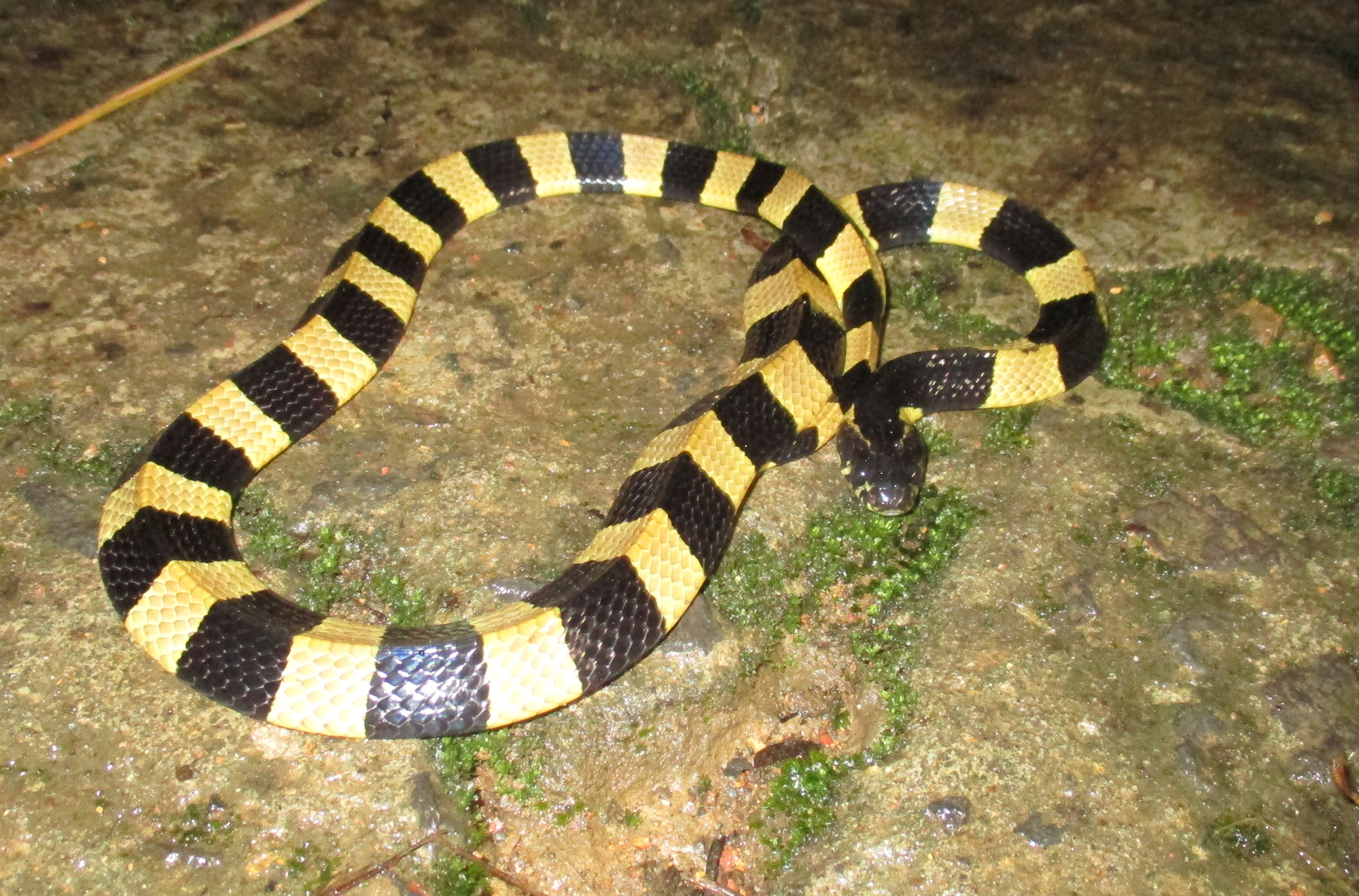
Banded krait in Cat Tien National Park
