= Craspedocephalus brasiliensis =

Craspedocephalus brasiliensis is a taxonomic synonym that may refer to the pit viper species:

- Bothrops alternatus, a.k.a. the urutu, found in southeastern Brazil, Paraguay, Uruguay and northern Argentina
- Bothrops jararaca, a.k.a. the jararaca, found in southern Brazil, northeastern Paraguay and northern Argentina
