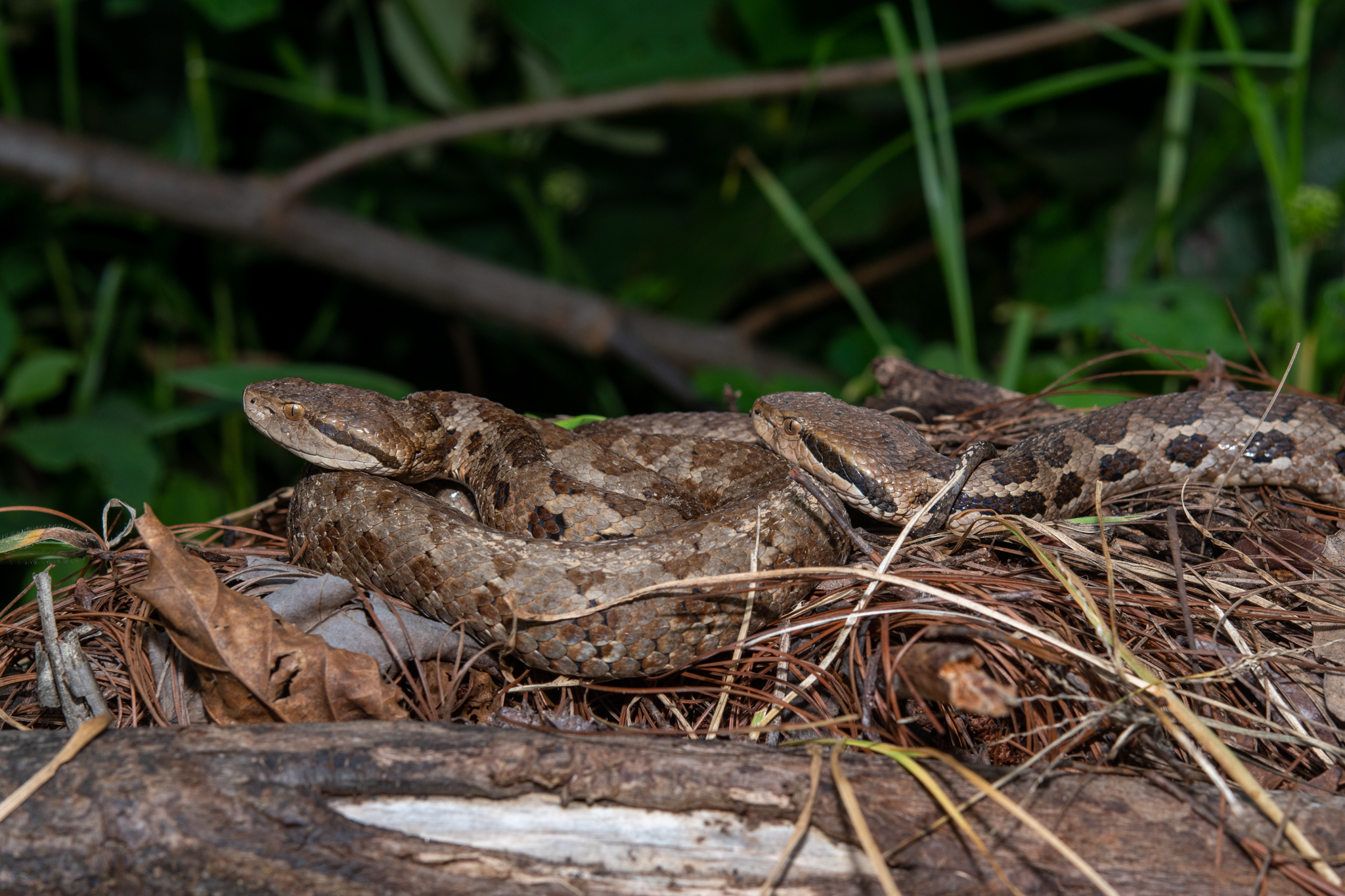
- Cerrophidion wilsoni in Honduras

Scientific classification
- Kingdom: Animalia
- Phylum: Chordata
- Class: Reptilia
- Order: Squamata
- Suborder: Serpentes
- Family: Viperidae
- Genus: Cerrophidion
- Species: C. wilsoni

Binomial name
- Cerrophidion wilsoni Jadin, Townsend, Castoe & Campbell, 2012

= Cerrophidion wilsoni =

Species of Snake

Cerrophidion wilsoni, the Honduras montane pitviper, is a species of venomous snake in the family Viperidae. It is endemic to Central America, where it is found in Honduras, El Salvador, and Nicaragua. It is widespread in highland cloud forests within its range, being found at elevations of 1,400 to 3,491 m (4,593 to 11,453 ft). The pitviper has a coffee-brown body color, with dark to chestnut brown splotches on the back, frequently fused to make a zig-zagging stripe. The sides have a series of blackish-brown, nearly round splotches, while the side of the head has a blackish-brown stripe from the eye to past the jaw, occasionally merging with the first of the dark patches on the sides. The underside is pale.

== Taxonomy ==
Specimens of Cerrophidion wilsoni were formerly considered to belong to C. godmani, which was then considered to be a wide-ranging species distributed from Mexico south to Panama. Beginning in the 2000s, genetic evidence began suggesting that C. godmani as then defined was paraphyletic with regard to the other two species in its genus, with deep divergences between different clades included in the species.

Cerrophidion wilsoni was formally described in 2012 based on an adult female specimen collected from Montaña de Botaderos Carlos Escaleras Mejía National Park in the department of Olancho in Honduras. The species is named after Larry David Wilson, a noted researcher of Central American amphibians and reptiles who described more than 70 species over the course of his career. The species has the English common name Honduras montane pitviper.

C. wilsoni is most closely related to C. sasai, with the two species diverging 3.1–6.0 million years ago (mya). This clade diverged from the other species within the genus 7.7–11.5 mya.

== Description ==
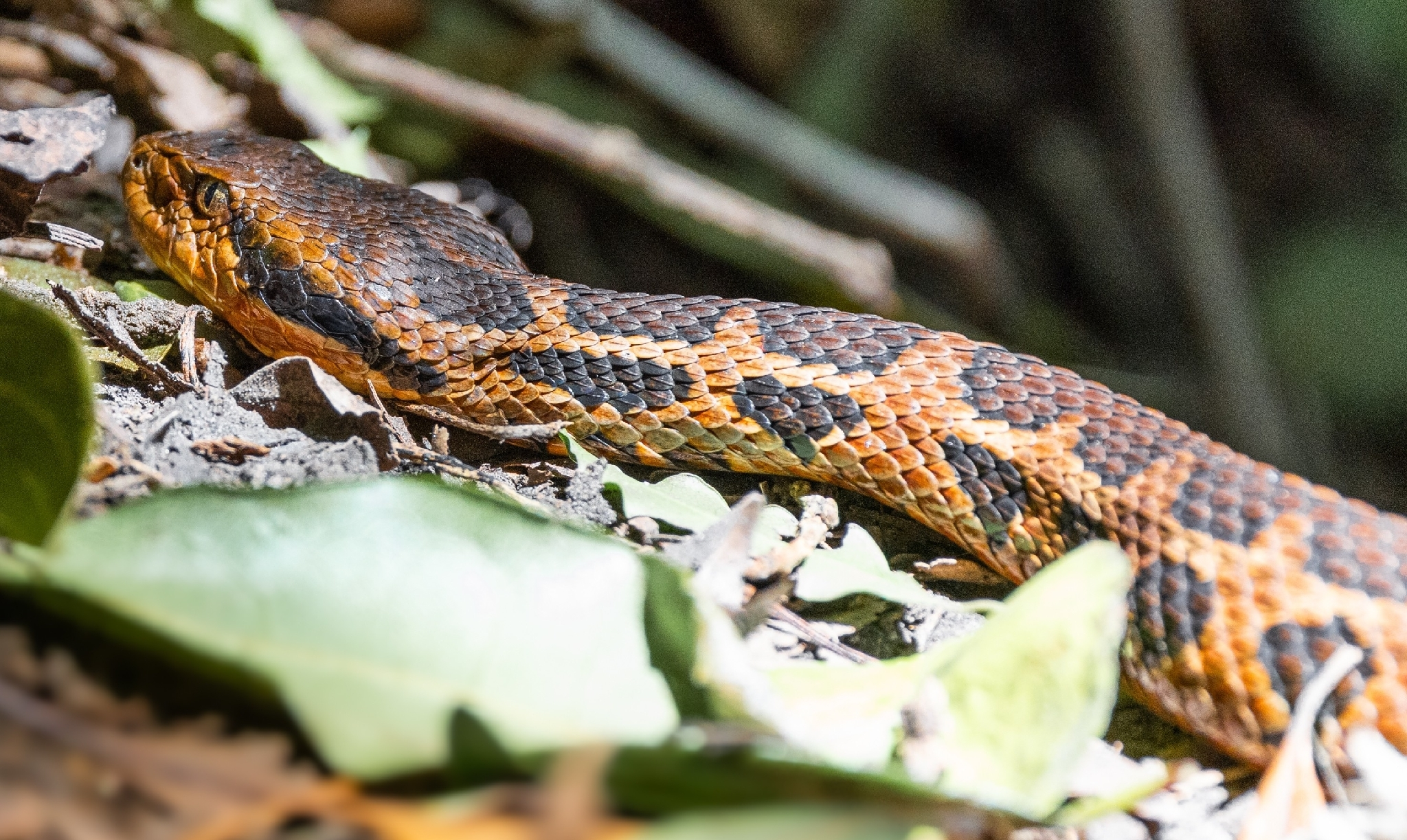
Head close-up, El Salvador

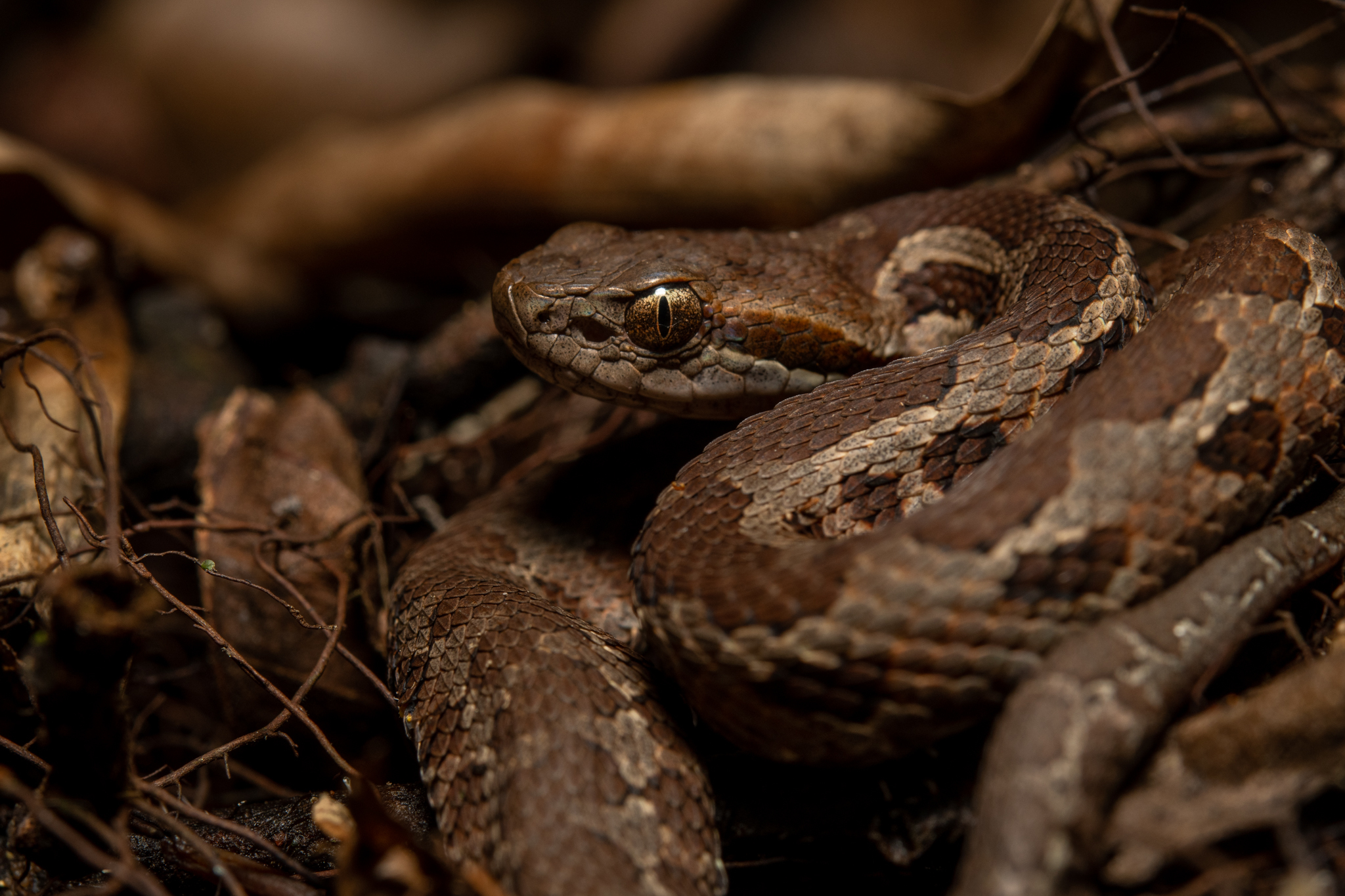
Juvenile, Honduras

The species has a coffee-brown body color, with dark to chestnut brown splotches on the back, frequently fused to make a zig-zagging stripe. The head has a blackish-brown stripe from the eye to past the jaw, occasionally merging with the first of the dark patches on the sides. The sides have a series of blackish-brown, nearly round splotches, located alternately from where the splotches on the back are. The throat is pale orange or yellow, while the underside is pale.

== Distribution and habitat ==
Like other species in its genus, Cerrophidion wilsoni is endemic to Central America, where it is found in Honduras, El Salvador, and Nicaragua. In Honduras, it is widespread throughout highland areas, with a lack of records from some montane protected areas likely being a result of undersampling rather than its true absence. The species was recorded from Nicaragua (as Cerrophidion godmani sensu lato) as far back as the 1960s, but due to a lack of photographs or specimens, the species' presence in the country was not confirmed until 2017. Localities in the Honduran and El Salvadorian border regions that harbor populations of C. wilsoni extend into Guatemala, making it likely that the species also occurs in the latter country.

The pitviper inhabits montane cloud forests and rainforests at elevations of 1,400 to 3,491 m (4,593 to 11,453 ft), sometimes being found as low as 1,220 m (4,000 ft) in pine-oak forests. It is known from both primary and secondary habitats, as well as dwarf forests, shrublands, and dwarf forests.

== Conservation ==
As a species restricted entirely to highland rainforests, Cerrophidion wilsoni benefits greatly from the Honduran Protected Areas System, which was established to protect the country's potable water by conserving montane forest at elevations above 1,800 m (5,900 ft). It occurs in over 15 national parks and biological reserves in that country, covering the entirety of its recorded distribution. It also occurs in protected areas in El Salvador and Nicaragua. It has been suggested as a suitable flagship species for cloud forests in the region, as it has been recorded from a moiety of the montane protected areas in Honduras and El Salvador.
