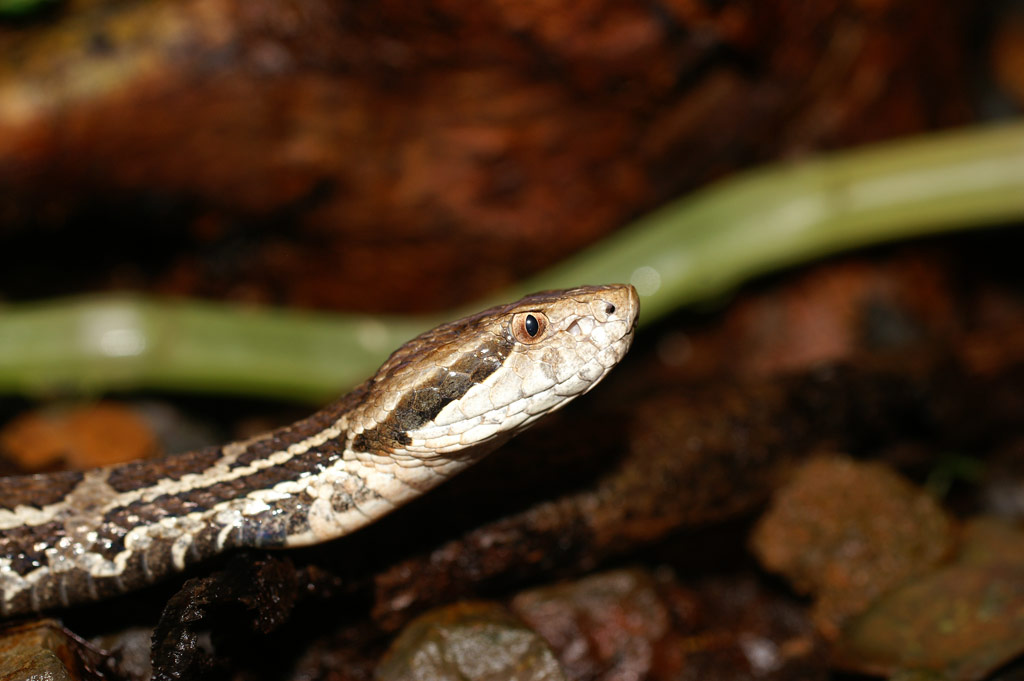
- Cerrophidion godmani Godman's montane pitviper

Scientific classification
- Kingdom: Animalia
- Phylum: Chordata
- Class: Reptilia
- Order: Squamata
- Suborder: Serpentes
- Family: Viperidae
- Subfamily: Crotalinae
- Genus: Cerrophidion; Campbell & Lamar, 1992

= Cerrophidion =

Genus of snakes

Common names: Montane pitvipers.

Cerrophidion is a genus of pit vipers which are endemic to southern Mexico, Central America, and western Panama. The generic name, Cerrophidion, is derived from the Spanish word cerro, which means "mountain", and the Greek word ophidion, which means "small snake". Five species are recognized as being valid, but no subspecies are.

== Description ==
Species in the genus Cerrophidion grow to a maximum total length (including tail) of 82.2 cm (32.4 in) (for C. godmani), but usually do not exceed 50–55 cm (20–22 in). The head scalation is highly variable, with some scales being enlarged, especially in the frontal region. The fact that the prelacunal is not fused with any of the supralabial scales is characteristic for this genus. The rest of the scalation is as follows: 1-7 intersupraoculars, 7-11 supralabials, 8-12 sublabials, 120-150 ventral scales, 22-36 subcaudal scales (undivided), and 17-21 rows (rarely 23) of dorsal scales at midbody.

== Geographic range ==
Cerrophidion species are found in southern Mexico (in the highlands of the Mexican states of Guerrero and southeastern Oaxaca), southward though the highlands of Central America (Guatemala, El Salvador, Honduras, northern Nicaragua and Costa Rica) to western Panama.

== Species ==
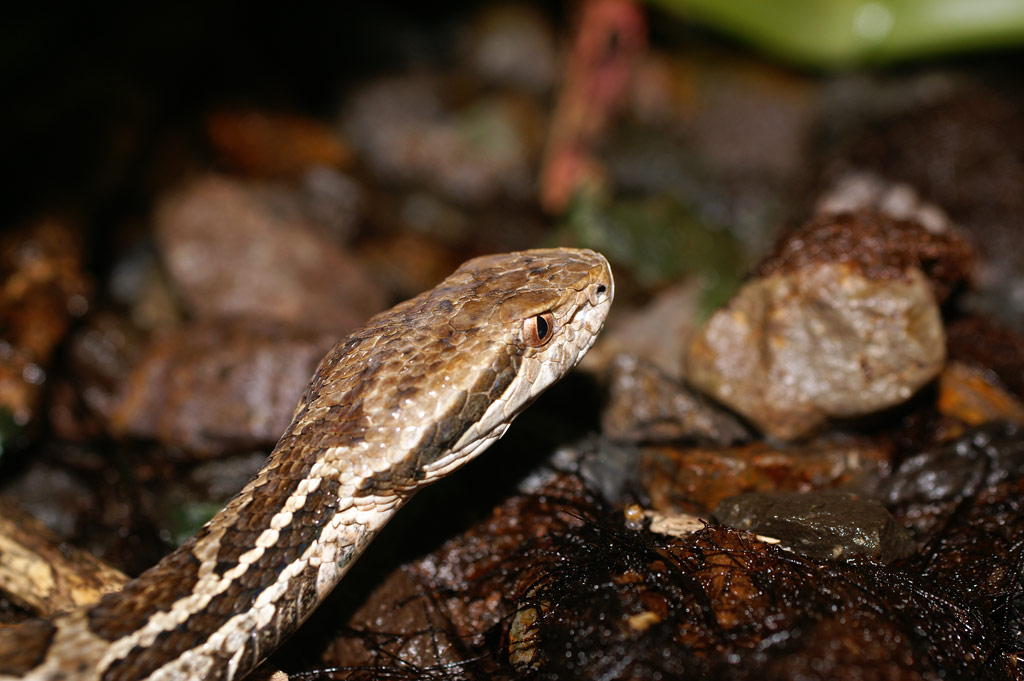
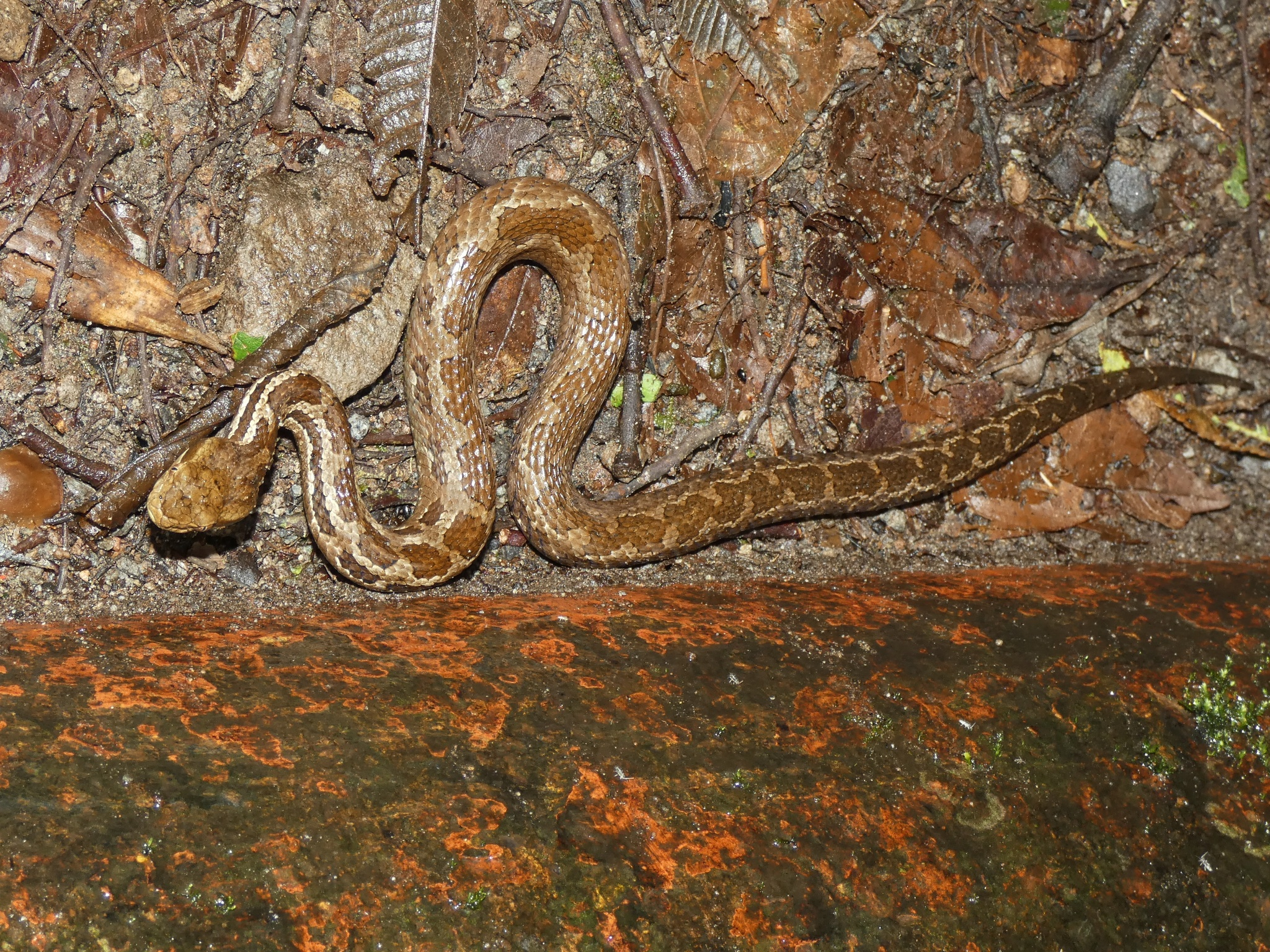
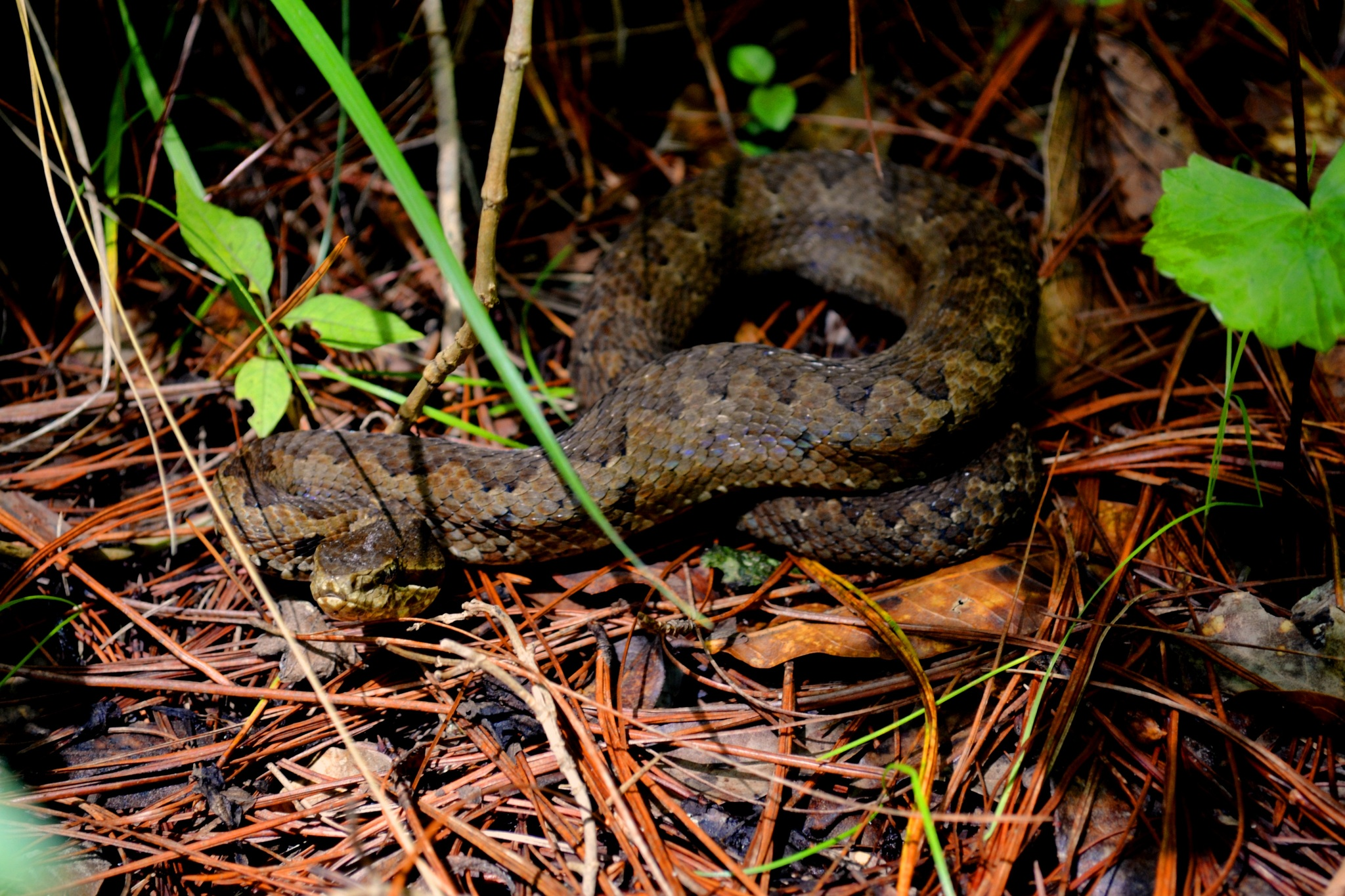
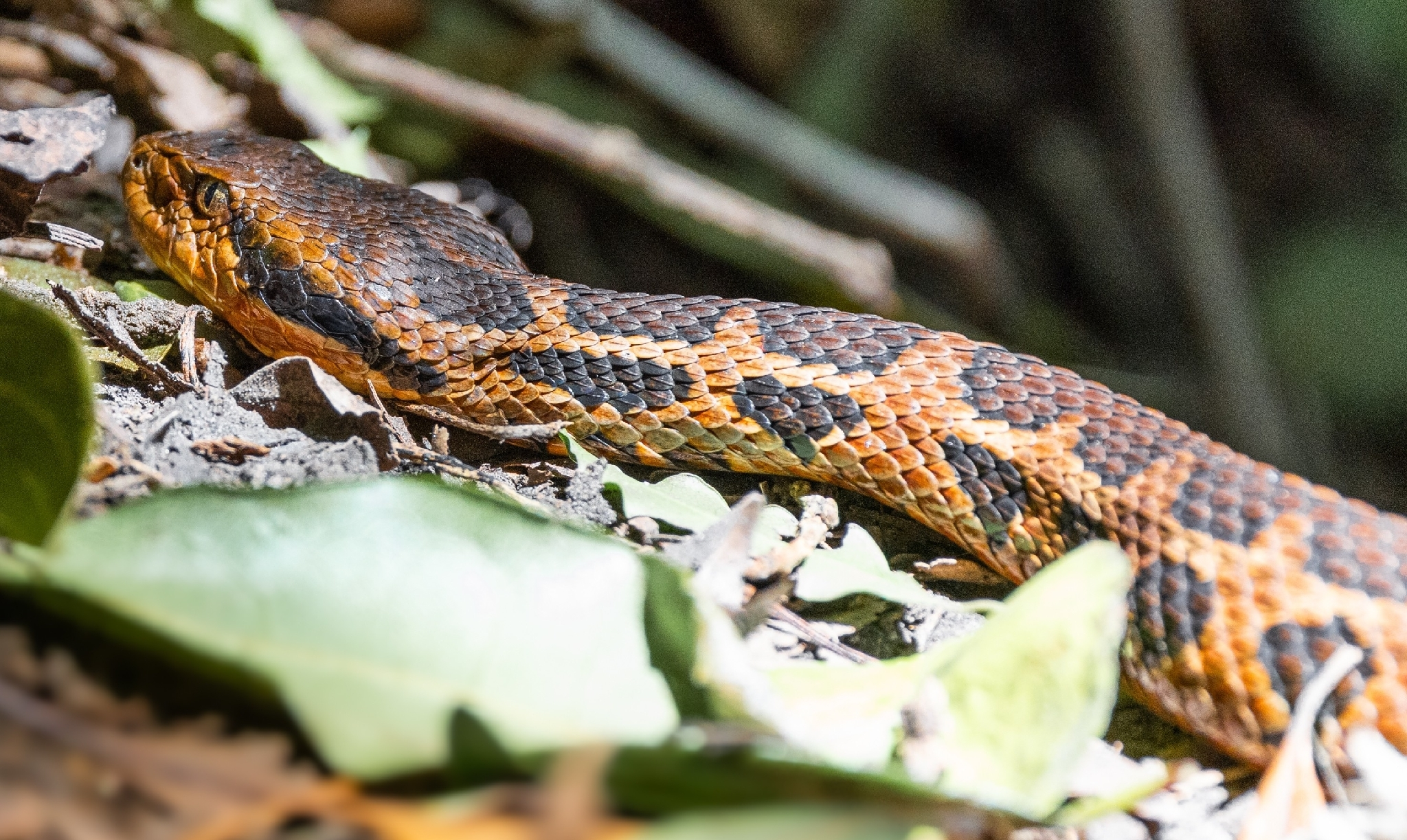
Image	Species	Taxon author	Common name	Geographic range
	C. godmani^{T}	(Günther, 1863)	Godman's montane pitviper	Southeastern Oaxaca and Chiapas, Mexico, through Central America to western Panama at moderate to high elevations.
	C. petlalcalensis	López-Luna, Vogt & de la Torre-Loranca, 1999	Cerro Petlalcala montane pitviper	Veracruz in Mexico.
	C. sasai	Jadin, Townsend, Castoe & Campbell, 2012	Costa Rica montane pitviper	Costa Rica and western Panama.
	C. tzotzilorum	(Campbell, 1985)	Tzotzil montane pitviper	Meseta Central of Chiapas, Mexico.
	C. wilsoni	Jadin, Townsend, Castoe & Campbell, 2012	Honduras montane pitviper	Honduras, El Salvador, and Nicaragua.

^{T}) Type species.
