= Bothrolysin =

Identifiers
- EC no.: 3.4.24.50
- CAS no.: 443890-65-1

Databases
- IntEnz: IntEnz view
- BRENDA: BRENDA entry
- ExPASy: NiceZyme view
- KEGG: KEGG entry
- MetaCyc: metabolic pathway
- PRIAM: profile
- PDB structures: RCSB PDB PDBe PDBsum
Search
- PMC: articles
- PubMed: articles
- NCBI: proteins

Bothrolysin (EC 3.4.24.50, Bothrops metalloendopeptidase J, J protease) is an enzyme. This enzyme catalyses the following chemical reaction

Cleavage of Gln^{4}-His, Ser^{9}-His and Ala^{14}-Leu of insulin B chain and Pro-Phe of angiotensin I

This endopeptidase is present in the venom of the jararaca snake (Bothrops jararaca).
