= Trigonocephalus bilineatus =

Trigonocephalus bilineatus is a taxonomic synonym that may refer to:

- Agkistrodon bilineatus, a.k.a. the cantil, a venomous pitviper found in Mexico and Central America
- Bothrops bilineatus, a.k.a. the two-striped forest-pitviper, a venomous pitviper found in the Amazon regions of South America
