= Jararhagin =

Enzyme

Identifiers
- EC no.: 3.4.24.73
- CAS no.: 160477-79-2

Databases
- IntEnz: IntEnz view
- BRENDA: BRENDA entry
- ExPASy: NiceZyme view
- KEGG: KEGG entry
- MetaCyc: metabolic pathway
- PRIAM: profile
- PDB structures: RCSB PDB PDBe PDBsum
Search
- PMC: articles
- PubMed: articles
- NCBI: proteins

Jararhagin (EC 3.4.24.73, HF2-proteinase, JF1) is an enzyme. This enzyme catalyses the following chemical reaction

Hydrolysis of -His^{10}-Leu-, -Ala^{14}-Leu-, -Tyr^{16}-Leu-and -Phe^{24}-Phe- bonds in insulin B chain

This endopeptidase is present in the venom of the jararaca snake (Bothrops jararaca).
