= Lore (anatomy) =

Area between eyes and nostrils

Arrow "11" indicates the lore of this eagle

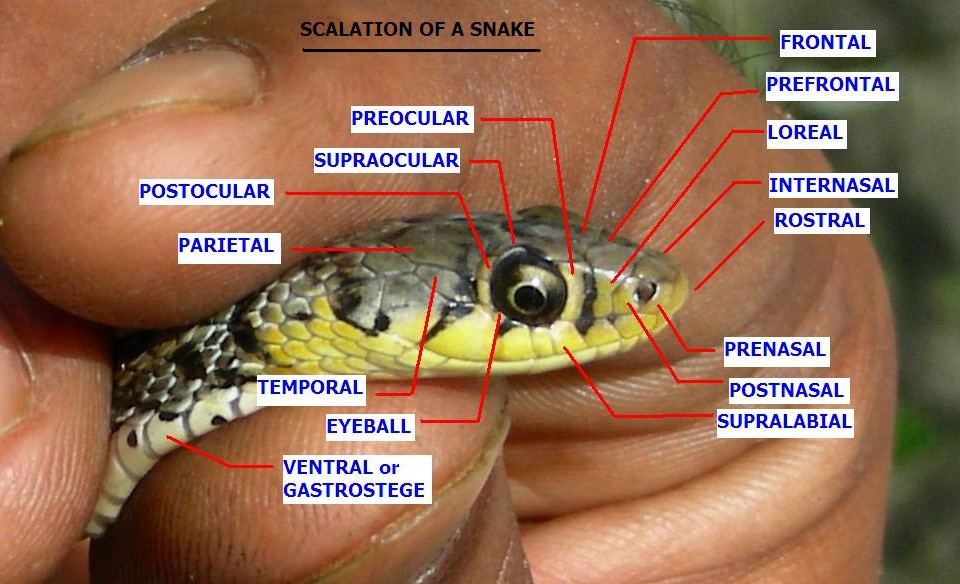
Scales on a snake's head

The lore (adj. loreal) is the region between the eyes and nostrils of birds, reptiles, and amphibians.

== Ornithology ==
In ornithology, the lore is the region between the eye and bill on the side of a bird's head. This region is sometimes featherless, and the skin may be tinted, as in many species of the cormorant family. This area, which is directly in front of the eye, features a "loral stripe" in many bird species including the red-capped plover.

== Herpetology ==
In amphibians and reptiles, lore pertains to the regions immediately adjacent to the eyes and between the eyes and nostrils. These are analogous to the lore on birds which corresponds to the region between the eye and the beak.

In snakes and reptiles, a loreal scale also refers to the scales which lie between the eye and the nostril. In crotaline snakes (pit vipers), loreal pits are present on either side of the head.

== See also ==
- Snake scales
- Anatomical terms of location
