= Loreal pit =

Anatomic structure in pit vipers

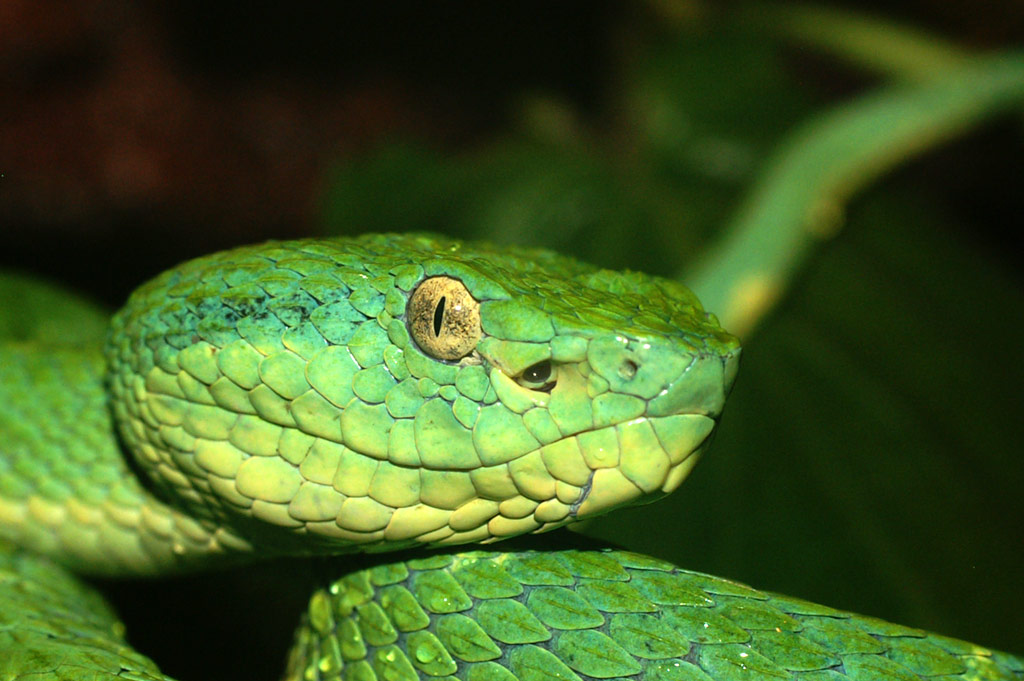
Bothriechis lateralis. The loreal pit is visible between the eye and the nostril.

The loreal pit is the deep depression, or fossa, in the loreal area on either side of the head in pit vipers (crotaline snakes). The area is located behind the nostril and in front of the eye, but below the line that runs between the centers of each. It is the external opening to an extremely sensitive infrared detecting organ. The loreal pit is bordered by lacunal scales. The loreal pit also functions as part of a thermal regulating system, enabling pit vipers to maintain their body temperature.

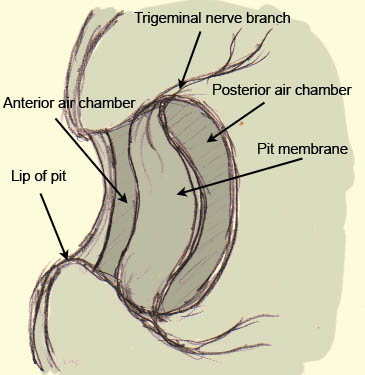
Diagram of the loreal pit.

The pit organ is complex in structure and is similar to the thermoreceptive labial pits found in boas and pythons. It is deep and located in a maxillary cavity. The membrane is like an eardrum that divides the pit into two sections of unequal size, with the larger of the two facing forwards and exposed to the environment. The two sections are connected via a narrow tube, or duct, that can be opened or closed by a group of surrounding muscles. By controlling this tube, the snake can balance the air pressure on either side of the membrane. The membrane has many nerve endings packed with mitochondria. Succinic dehydrogenase, lactic dehydrogenase, adenosine triphosphate, monoamine oxidase, generalized esterases, and acetylcholine esterase have also been found in it. When prey comes into range, infrared radiation falling onto the membrane allows the snake to determine its direction. Having one of these organs on either side of the head produces a stereo effect that indicates distance, as well as direction. Experiments have shown, when deprived of their senses of sight and smell, pit vipers can strike accurately at moving objects less than 0.2 °C (0.36 °F) warmer than the background. The paired pit organs provide the snake with thermal rangefinder capabilities. These organs are of great value to a predator that hunts at night, as well as for avoiding the snake’s own predators.
