= Cerrophidion petlalcalensis =

Scientific classification
- Kingdom: Animalia
- Phylum: Chordata
- Class: Reptilia
- Order: Squamata
- Suborder: Serpentes
- Family: Viperidae
- Genus: Cerrophidion
- Species: C. petlalcalensis

Binomial name
- Cerrophidion petlalcalensis López-luna, Vogt & Torre-Loranca, 1999

Species of snake from Mexico

Cerrophidion petlalcalensis, also known as Cerro Petlalcala montane pitviper and Petates de Cerro Petlalcala, is a species of venomous, terrestrial pitviper from Mexico.

== Diet ==
Cerrophidon petlalcalensis has been known to eat plethodontid salamanders.
