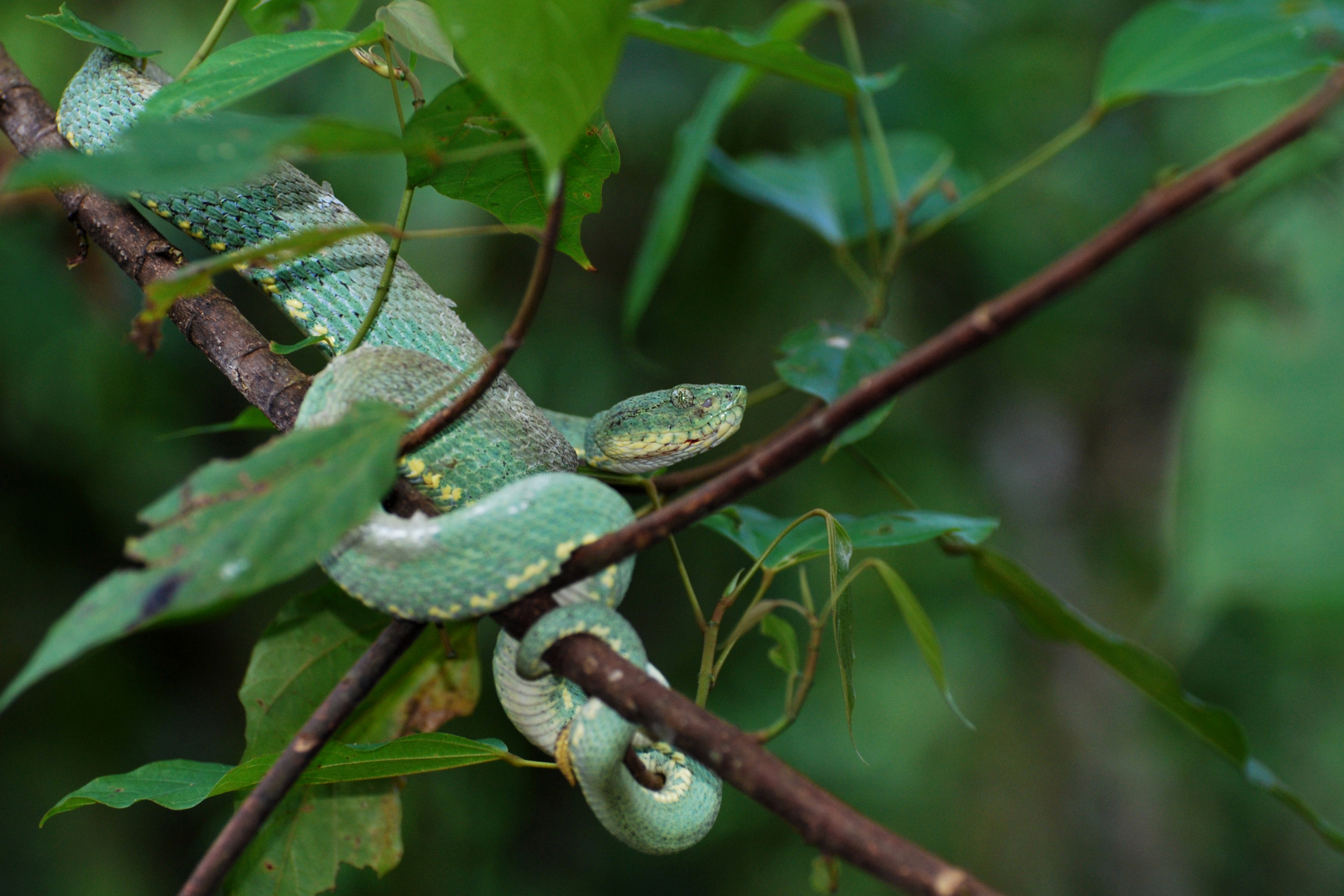

Scientific classification
- Kingdom: Animalia
- Phylum: Chordata
- Class: Reptilia
- Order: Squamata
- Suborder: Serpentes
- Family: Viperidae
- Genus: Bothrops
- Species: B. bilineatus
- Subspecies: B. b. smaragdinus

Trinomial name
- Bothrops bilineatus smaragdinus (Hoge, 1966)

Synonyms
- Bothrops bilineatus smaragdinus - Hoge, 1966; Bothriopsis bilineatus smaragdina - Campbell & Lamar, 1989; B[othriechis]. bilineata smaragdina - Schätti, Kramer & Touzet, 1990; Bothriechis bilineatus smaragdinus - Schätti & Kramer, 1993

= Bothrops bilineatus smaragdinus =

Subspecies of snake

Common names: (Two-striped forest pitviper).

Bothrops bilineatus smaragdinus is a venomous pitviper subspecies found in the northern and western Amazon region of South America.

== Description ==
Same as for B. b. bilineatus, except that it lacks any dark vertical stripes on the supralabial scales and its green dorsal ground color is only patterned only with a peppering of black specks (no tan or reddish brown spots present).

== Geographic range ==
Found in South America in the Amazon regions of Southern Colombia (Departments of Putumayo, Amazonas, Southern Caqueta and Guaviare), southern Venezuela, northern and western Brazil, Ecuador, Peru and Bolivia. The type locality given is "upper Purús river, State Amazonas, Brasil."
