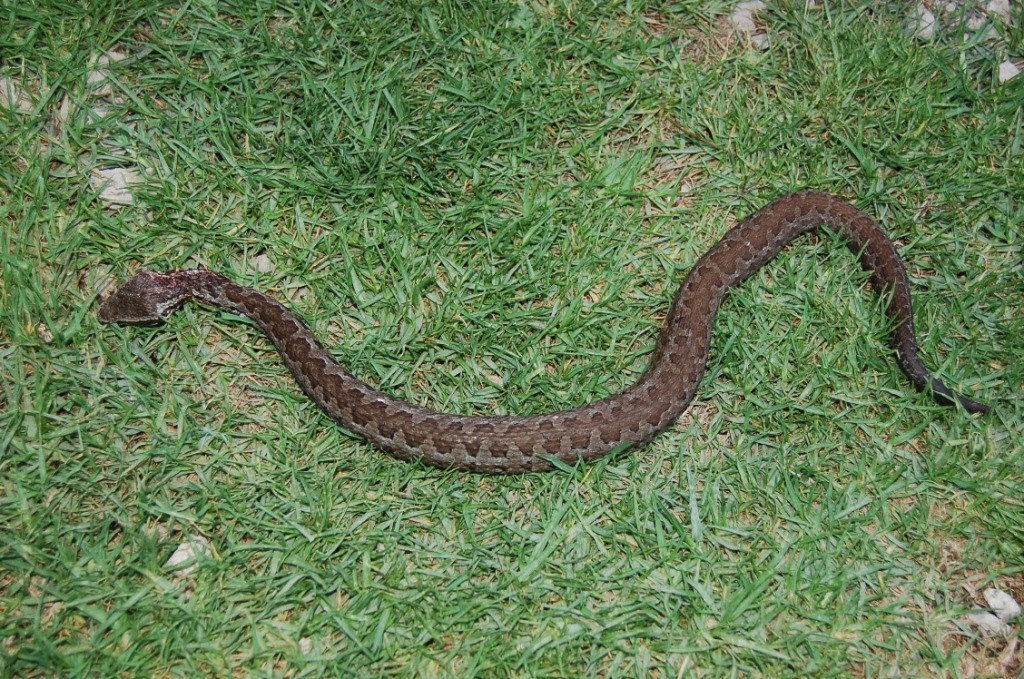

Conservation status
- Least Concern (IUCN 3.1)

Scientific classification
- Kingdom: Animalia
- Phylum: Chordata
- Class: Reptilia
- Order: Squamata
- Suborder: Serpentes
- Family: Viperidae
- Genus: Cerrophidion
- Species: C. tzotzilorum

Binomial name
- Cerrophidion tzotzilorum (Campbell, 1985)
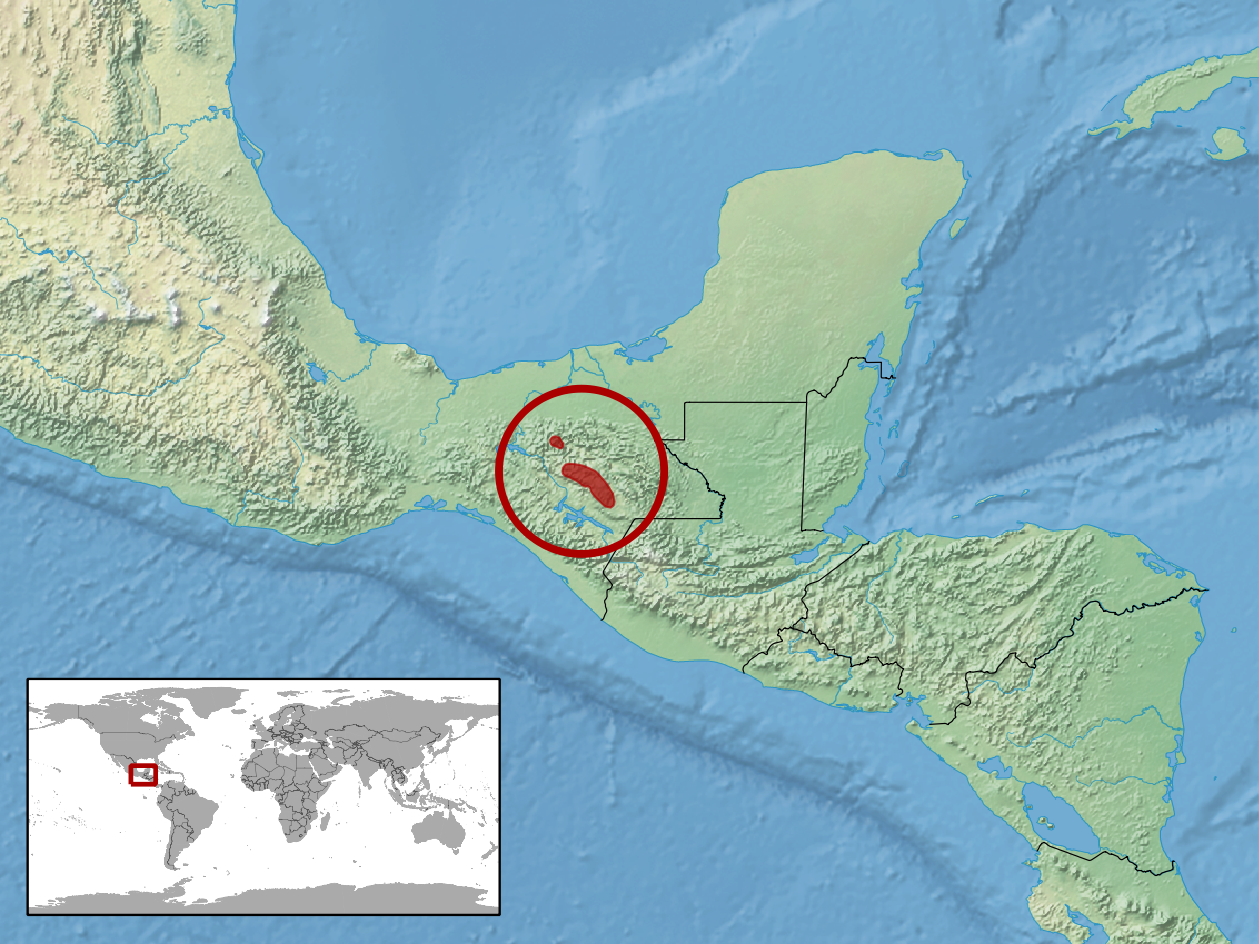

Synonyms
- Bothrops tzotzilorum Campbell, 1985; Porthidium tzotzilorum — Campbell & Lamar, 1989; Cerrophidion tzotzilorum — Campbell & Lamar, 1992

= Cerrophidion tzotzilorum =

Species of snake

Common names: Tzotzil montane pitviper.

Cerrophidion tzotzilorum is a venomous pit viper species which is native to southern Mexico. There are no subspecies that are recognized as being valid.

== Etymology ==
The specific name, tzotzilorum (Latin genitive plural), is in honor of the Tzotzil people.

== Description ==
C. tzotzilorum is terrestrial and moderately stout. Adults probably do not exceed 50 cm (19.5 in) in total length (including tail).

== Geographic range ==
C. tzotzilorum is found in the Meseta Central of Chiapas, Mexico. The type locality given is "10.9 km Jiji ESE San Cristobal de Las Casas, Chiapas, Mexico, elevation 2,320 m [7,610 ft]".

== Habitat ==
The preferred natural habitat of C. tzotzilorum is forest.

== Diet ==
C. tzotzilorum is known to prey upon orthopterans and lizards.

== Reproduction ==
C. tzotzilorum is viviparous.

== Conservation status ==
The species C. tzotzilorum is classified as Least Concern (LC) on the IUCN Red List of Threatened Species (v3.1, 2001). Species are listed as such due to their wide distribution, presumed large population, or because it is unlikely to be declining fast enough to qualify for listing in a more threatened category. The population trend is stable. Year assessed: 2007.
