= Lacunolabial scale =

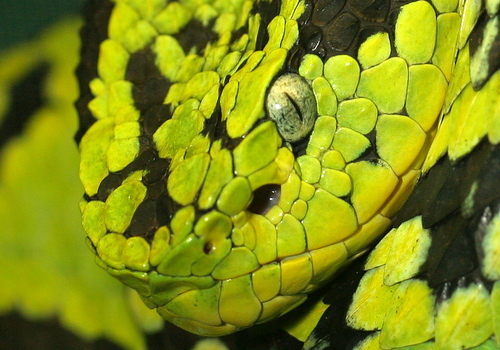
Bothriechis aurifer

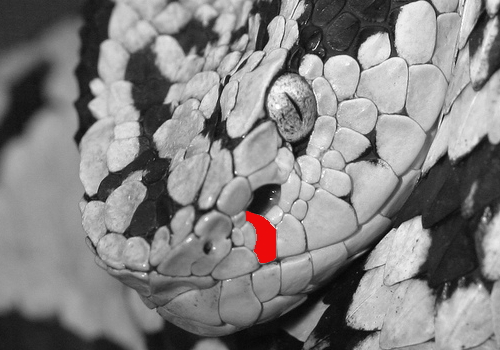
Lacunolabial

The lacunolabial scale is a large scale that forms in some crotaline snakes (pitvipers) when the prelacunal scale fuses with the second (rarely the third) supralabial scale. In such cases, it is often said that "the second labial enters the pit". Some pitvipers, such as Bothrops alternatus, Bothrops erythromelas, Bothrops itapetiningae and Bothrops neuwiedi, have a divided lacunolabial scale.
