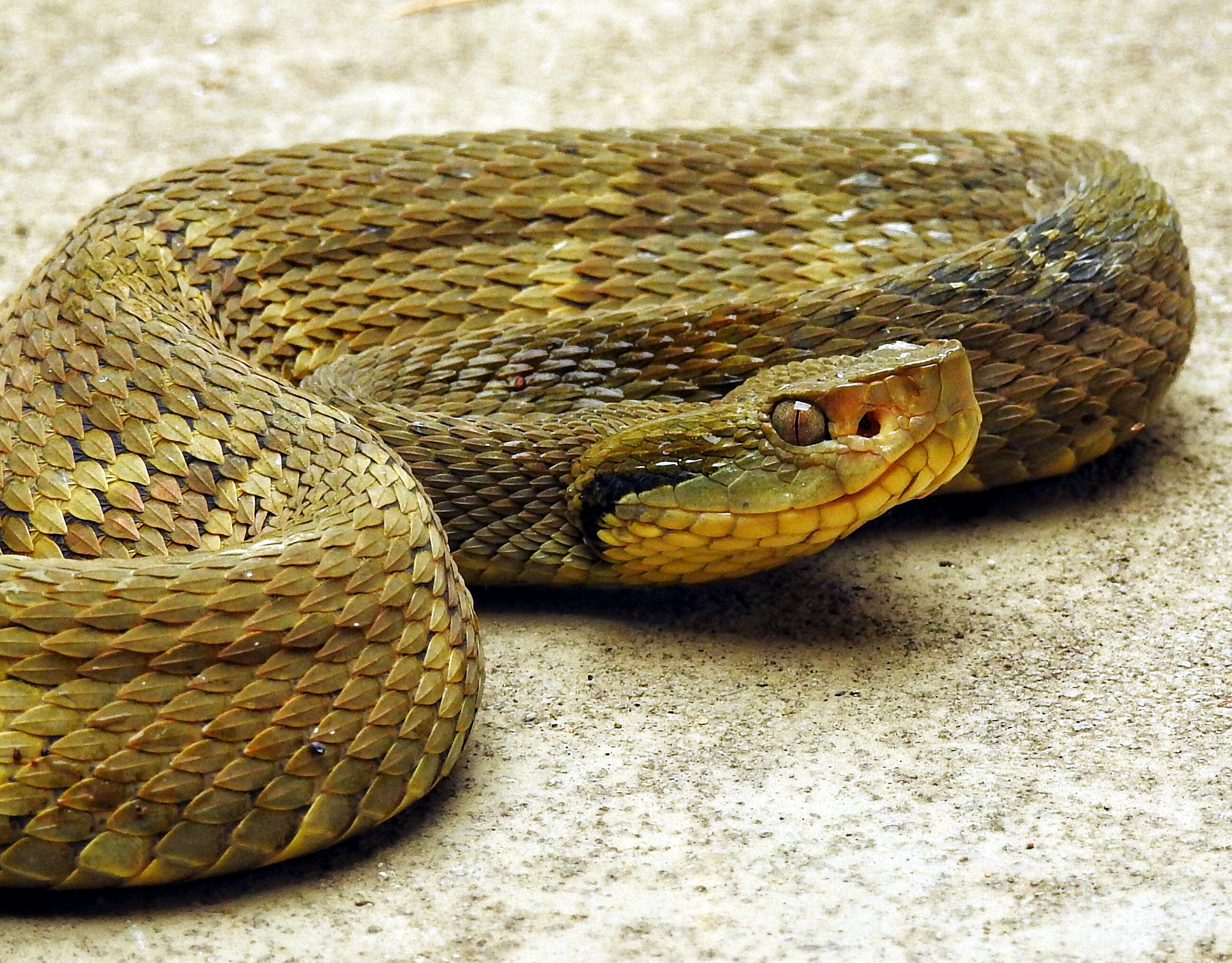

Conservation status
- Least Concern (IUCN 3.1)

Scientific classification
- Kingdom: Animalia
- Phylum: Chordata
- Class: Reptilia
- Order: Squamata
- Suborder: Serpentes
- Family: Viperidae
- Genus: Bothrops
- Species: B. jararaca

Binomial name
- Bothrops jararaca (Wied-Neuwied, 1824)

Synonyms
- Cophias jajaraca [sic] Wied-Neuwied, 1824; Bothrops leucostigma Wagler, 1824; Cophias jararaca Wied-Neuwied, 1824; [Cophias] jararaca – Wied-Neuwied, 1825; C[ophias]. Jararakka [sic] – Wied-Neuwied, 1825; Cophias jararaca – Wagler, 1830; T[rigonocephalus]. jararaca – Schlegel, 1837; Craspedocephalus brasiliensis Günther, 1858; Crotalus craspedocephalus brasiliensis – Higgins, 1873; Bothrops jararaca – Golay et al., 1993; Bothropoides jararaca – Fenwick et al., 2009

= Bothrops jararaca =

Species of snake

Bothrops jararaca—known as the jararaca or yarara—is a highly venomous pit viper species endemic to South America in southern Brazil, Paraguay, and northern Argentina. The specific name, jararaca, is derived from Old Tupi îararaka. Within its geographic range, it is often abundant and is an important cause of snakebite. No subspecies are currently recognized.

The drugs known as angiotensin converting enzyme (ACE) inhibitors, used for the treatment of hypertension and some types of congestive heart failure, were developed from a peptide found in the venom of this species.

== Description ==
This is a slender and terrestrial species that grows to a maximum total length of 160 cm (63 in), although the average total length is much less.

The head scalation includes 5–12 intersupraoculars that are weakly keeled, 7–9 supralabials (usually 8) of which the second is fused with the prelacunal to form a lacunolabial, and 9–13 sublabials (usually 10–12). The midbody has 20–27 rows of dorsal scales (usually 23–25). The ventrals number 170–216 (rarely 218) and the 51–71 subcaudals are mostly paired.

The color pattern is extremely variable, consisting of a dorsal ground color that may be tan, brown, gray, yellow, olive, or almost maroon. Midbody, this color is usually somewhat lighter than the head, anterior and posterior. The dorsal ground color is overlaid with a series of pale-edged, dark brown, subtriangular or trapezoidal markings on either side of the body, the apices of which reach the vertebral line. These marking may be situated opposite each other, or partially or completely juxtaposed; most specimens have a pattern with all three variations. In juveniles, the tip of the tail is white.

The head has a prominent, dark brown stripe that runs from behind the eye, on either side of the head, back to the angle of the mouth, usually touching the last three supralabials. Dorsally, this stripe is bordered by a distinct pale area. The tongue is black, and the iris is gold to greenish gold with slightly darker reticulations.

== Behavior ==
This snake usually hunts at night and during the day takes shelter in foliage; in habitats at higher altitudes and those with colder months, a significant reduction in activities occurs, with greater activity observed during the warmer months.

They are ambush predators and equipped with good camouflage; juveniles use caudal luring to attract and capture prey, making movements with the tip of the tail, which is white and appears very similar to an insect larva.

== Common names ==
The English common name is jararaca. In Argentina, it is called yarará and yararaca perezosa. In Brazil, it is referred to as caissaca, jaraca, jaracá, jararaca, jararaca-do-rabo-branco, jararaca-do-campo, jararaca-do-cerrado, jararaca-dormideira, jararaca-dominhoca and malha-de-sapo. In Paraguay and Uruguay, it is also called yarará.

== Geographic range ==
The snake's habitat is the Brazilian Atlantic Forest, today southern Brazil, eastern Paraguay (specifically the departments of Alto Paraná and Canindeyú) and the Argentine province of Misiones). Two closely related species, B. alcatraz and B. insularis, occur on Brazilian islands.

The type locality is listed as "Lagoa d'Arara am Mucurí" (Brazil) by Wied-Neuwied in 1825. It occurs from near sea level to over 1,000 m (3,280 ft) altitude.

== Habitat ==
This species mainly inhabits dense tropical perennial forests on the Atlantic coast. They also live in thickets, savannas, and semitropical highland forests, as well as in cultivated fields. Adults are mainly terrestrial, but juveniles are also arboreal.

== Feeding ==
The eating habits of this species are generalist, with an ontogenetic change in the feeding on ectothermic prey. Juveniles feed 75% on frogs and arthropods, while adults feed on mammals, with 80% of the diet of adult snakes being rodents.

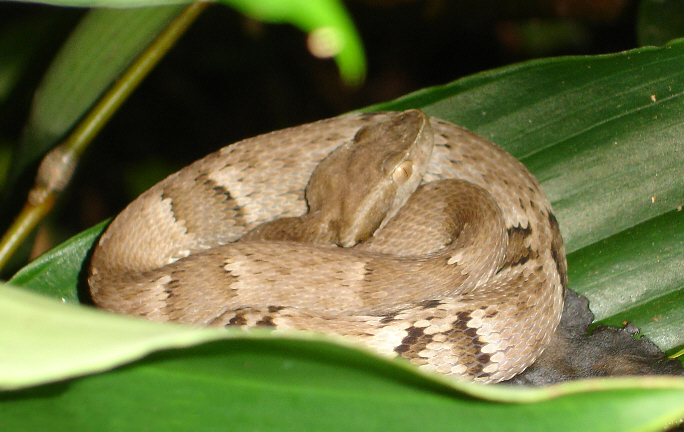
Bothrops jararaca

== Reproduction ==
Mating takes place in April and May. Males mate with more than one female, and fights between males for females happen, as well. Females demonstrate secondary vitellogenesis. While ovulation and fertilization occur in the spring (October to December or January), the female gives birth from February to April, on average producing 10 to 14 offspring per season. Both sexes are believed to reach sexual maturity at two years of age.

== Venom ==
=== Potency ===
This species is often abundant within its range of southeastern Brazil, where it was responsible for 52% (3,446 cases) of snakebites between 1902 and 1945, with a 0.7% fatality rate.

The average venom yield is 25–26 milligrams (0.39–0.40 gr) with a maximum of 300 milligrams (4.6 gr) of dried venom. The venom is quite toxic. In mice, the median lethal dose (LD_{50}) is 1.2–1.3 mg/kg intravenously, 1.4 mg/kg intraperitoneally, and 3.0 mg/kg subcutaneously. The lethal dose for a 60 kg adult human is 70 mg.

=== Effects ===
Typical envenomation symptoms include local swelling, petechiae, bruising and blistering of the affected limb, spontaneous systemic bleeding of the gums and into the skin, subconjunctival hemorrhage, and incoagulable blood. The systemic symptoms can potentially be fatal and may involve hemostatic disorders, intracranial hemorrhage, shock, and kidney failure.

Thrombotic microangiopathy has also been reported. A 56-year-old woman was transferred from a primary hospital seven hours after being bitten by a B. jararaca in the distal left leg. She developed extending edema to the proximal thigh, associated with intense, radiating local pain, local paresthesia, and ecchymosis. Laboratory features upon admission revealed coagulopathy, thrombocytopenia, and a slight increase in serum creatinine. The patient was treated with bothropic antivenom and fluid replacement. During evolution, her thrombocytopenia and anemia worsened, with blood films showing fragmented red cells, haptoglobin consumption, an increase in lactate dehydrogenase, and a progressive increase in serum creatinine. Despite the severity, the outcome following conservative treatment was good, with complete recovery.

=== Medical uses ===
The drugs known as ACE inhibitors, which are used for the treatment of hypertension and some types of congestive heart failure, were developed from a peptide found in the venom of this species in 1965 by Brazilian scientist Sérgio Henrique Ferreira.

Haemocoagulase enzyme derived from the venom is used as antihemorrhagic drug.
