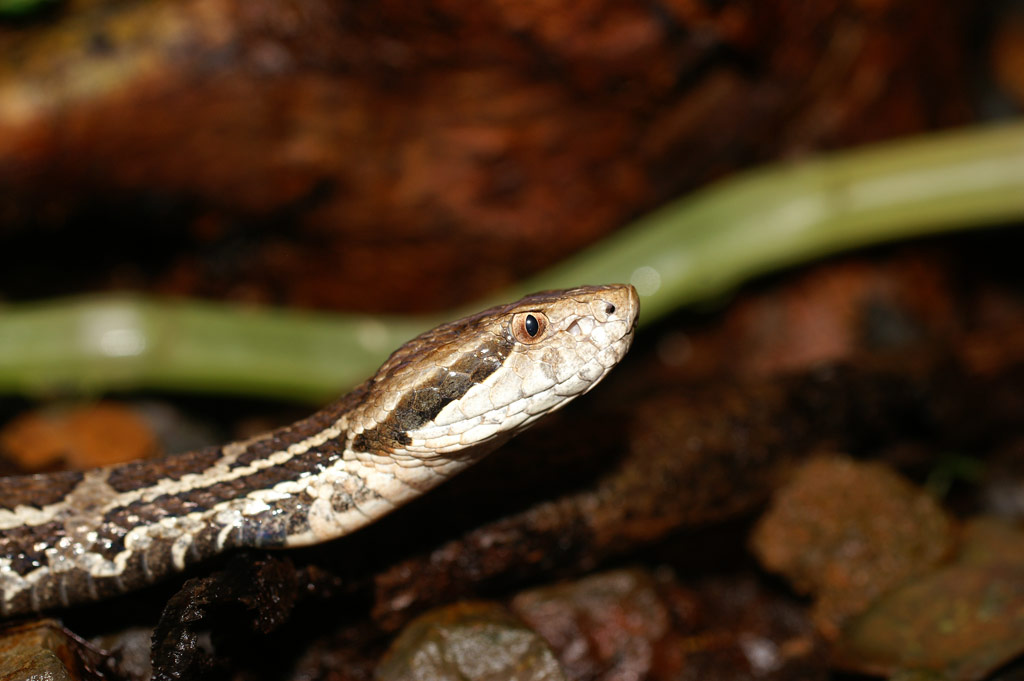

Conservation status
- Least Concern (IUCN 3.1)

Scientific classification
- Kingdom: Animalia
- Phylum: Chordata
- Class: Reptilia
- Order: Squamata
- Suborder: Serpentes
- Family: Viperidae
- Genus: Cerrophidion
- Species: C. godmani

Binomial name
- Cerrophidion godmani (Günther, 1863)

Synonyms
- Bothriechis Godmanni Günther, 1863; Bothrops Brammianus Bocourt, 1868; Bothriopsis godmannii — Cope, 1871; Bothrops (Bothriopsis) Godmanii — F. Müller, 1877; Bothriopsis Godmanii F. Müller, 1877; Bothrops Godmani — F. Müller, 1878; Bothriechis scutigera Fischer, 1880; Bothriechis trianguligera Fischer, 1883; Bothriopsis godmani — Cope, 1887; Bothriopsis scutigera — Cope, 1887; Bothriopsis trianguligera — Cope, 1887; Bothriechis godmani — Günther, 1895; Lachesis godmani — Boulenger, 1896; Trimeresurus godmani — Mocquard, 1909; Bothrops godmani — Barbour & Loveridge, 1929; [Bothrops] godmanni — Amaral, 1944; Bothrops godmanni — Hoge, 1966; Porthidium godmani — Campbell & Lamar, 1989; Cerrophidion godmani — Campbell & Lamar, 1992

= Cerrophidion godmani =

Species of snake

Cerrophidion godmani is a venomous pit viper species native to southern Mexico and Guatemala. No subspecies are recognized as being valid. It is also known commonly as Godman's montane pit viper or Godman's pit viper.

== Etymology ==
The specific name, godmani, is in honor of English zoologist Frederick DuCane Godman.

== Description ==
Terrestrial and moderately stout, adults of C. godmani are usually less than 55 cm (21.5 in) in total length (including tail), but sometimes grow to more than 75 cm (30 in). The tail is non-prehensile and short. The dorsal scales are in 21 rows at midbody.

== Geographic range ==
C. godmani is found in Mexico, in the Mexican states of Chiapas and southeastern Oaxaca, and in Guatemala. Populations from south of Guatemala are assigned to a new species, Cerrophidion sasai. The type locality for C. godmani given by Günther in 1863 is "near Dueñas and on other parts of the tableland of Guatemala".

== Habitat ==
The preferred natural habitats of C. godmani are forest and grassland, at altitudes of 1,400–3,491 m (4,593–11,453 ft).

== Behavior ==
C. godmani is terrestrial, and it is both diurnal and nocturnal.

== Diet ==
Adults of C. godmani prey predominately upon small mammals, and will occasionally eat amphibians, reptiles, and birds. Juveniles eat mostly arthropods.

== Reproduction ==
C. godmani is ovoviviparous.
