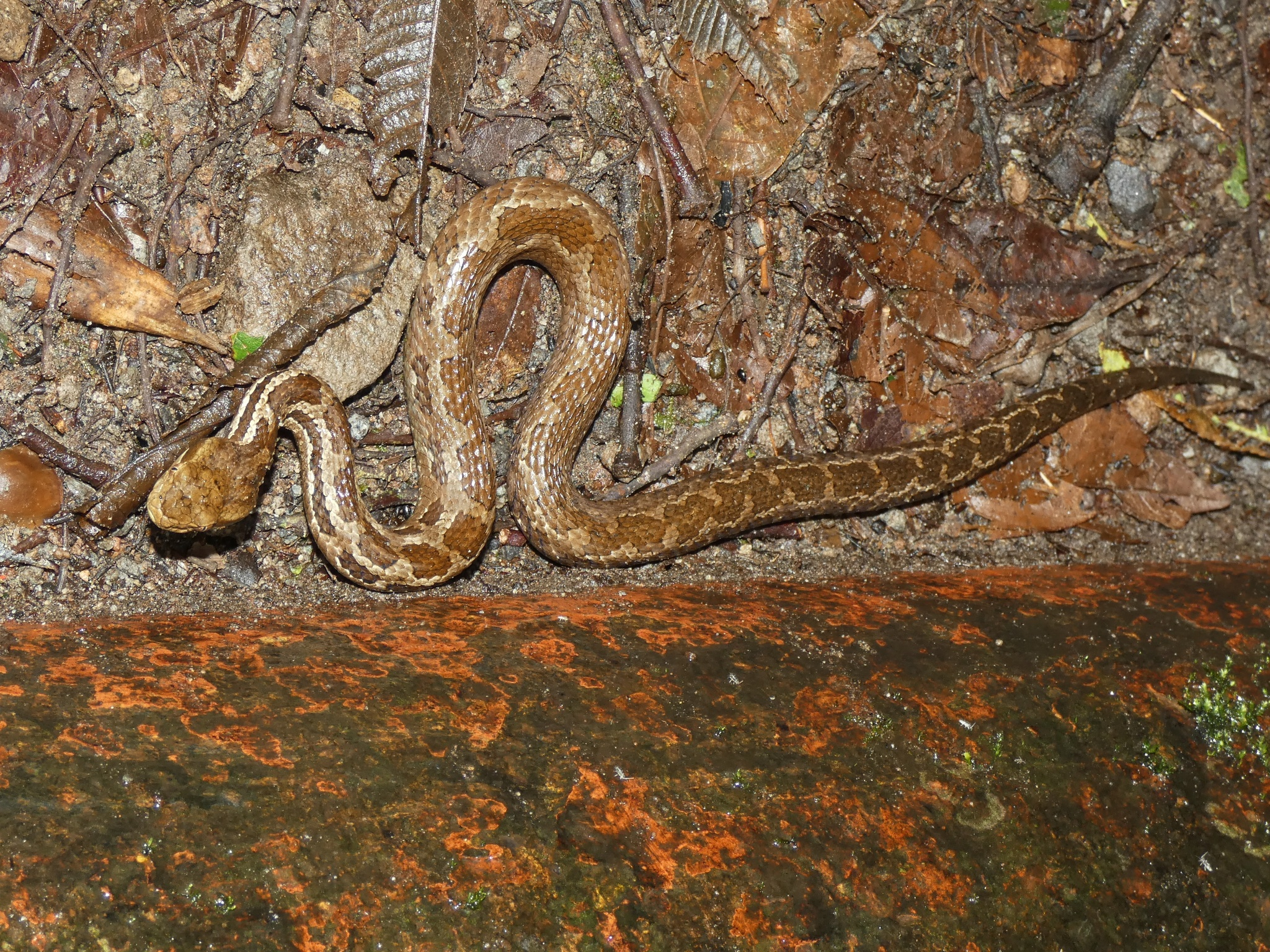

Scientific classification
- Kingdom: Animalia
- Phylum: Chordata
- Class: Reptilia
- Order: Squamata
- Suborder: Serpentes
- Family: Viperidae
- Genus: Cerrophidion
- Species: C. sasai

Binomial name
- Cerrophidion sasai Jadin, Townsend, Castoe & Campbell, 2012

= Cerrophidion sasai =

Species of Snake

Cerrophidion sasai, the Costa Rica montane pitviper, is a venomous snake mostly found in the southeastern parts of Mexico to the west of Panama. In Costa Rica it is found in the Cordillera Central and Cordillera de Talamanca at altitudes from 1,460 to 2,875 m (4,790 to 9,430 ft)

It is a diurnal species of snake that usually feeds on small mammals, birds, lizards, snakes, amphibians, and arthropods.
