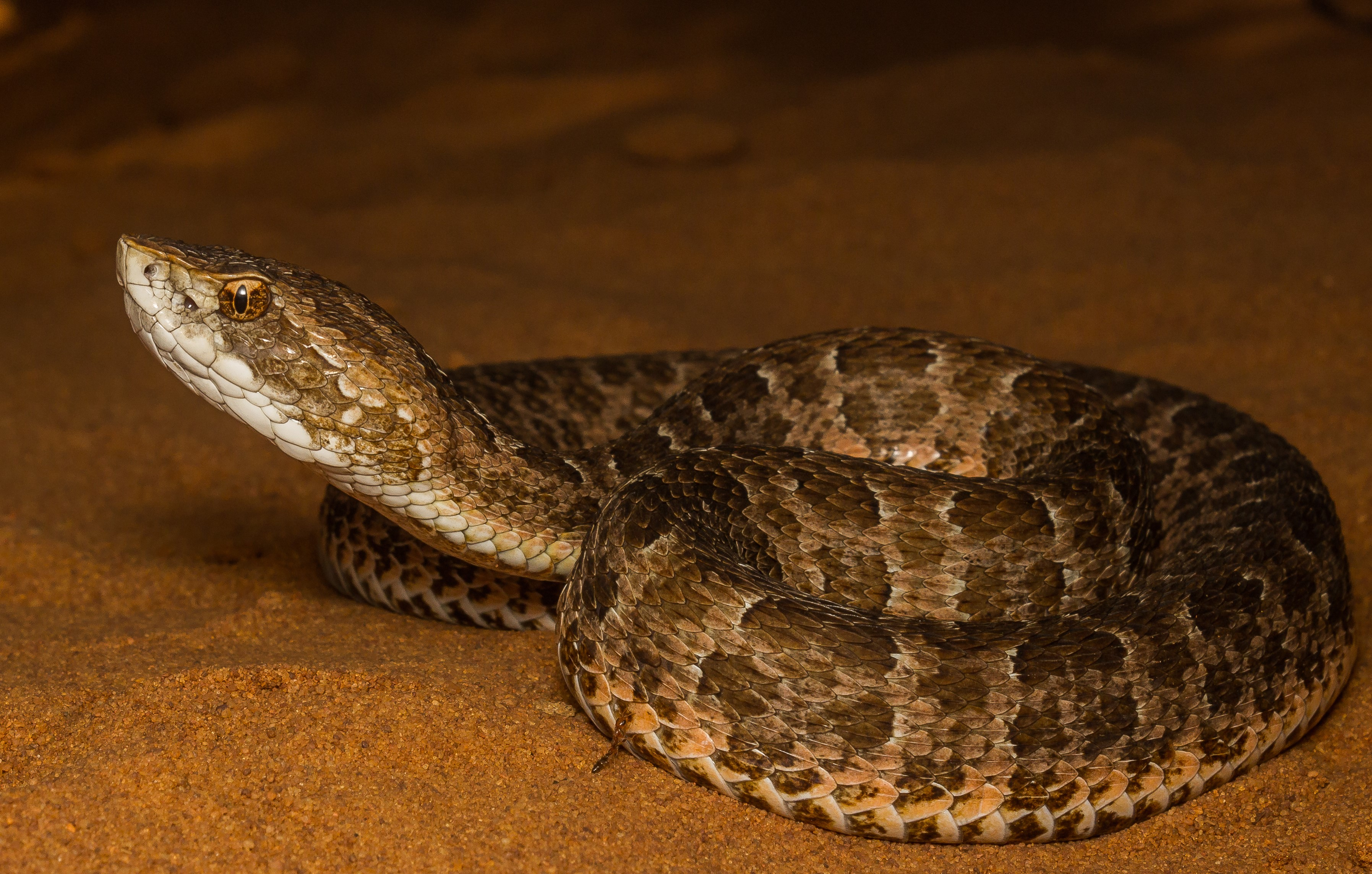

Conservation status
- Vulnerable (IUCN 3.1)

Scientific classification
- Kingdom: Animalia
- Phylum: Chordata
- Class: Reptilia
- Order: Squamata
- Suborder: Serpentes
- Family: Viperidae
- Genus: Bothrops
- Species: B. itapetiningae

Binomial name
- Bothrops itapetiningae (Boulenger, 1907)
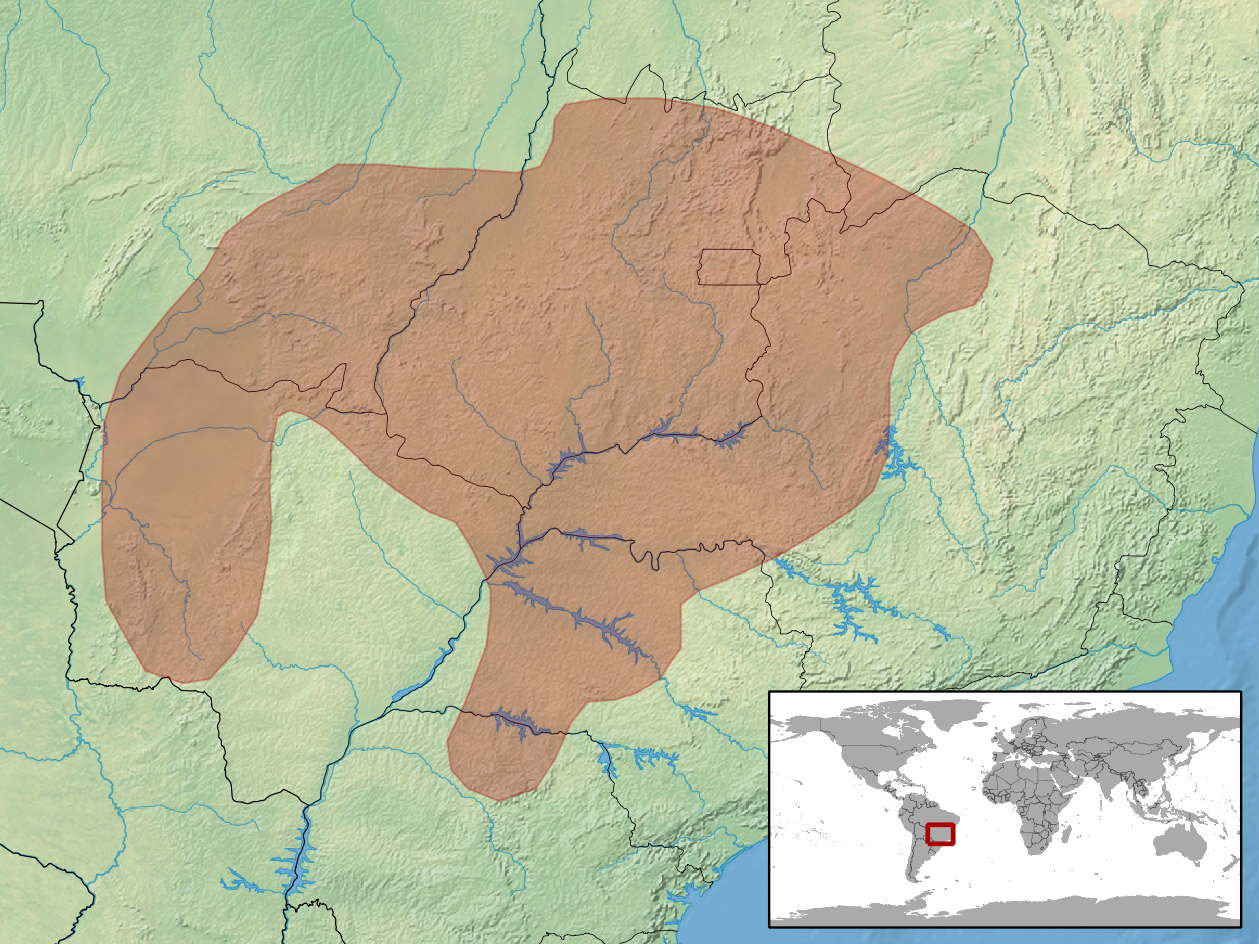

Synonyms
- Lachesis itapetiningae Boulenger, 1907; Bothrops itapetiningae – Amaral, 1929; Rhinocerophis itapetiningae – Fenwick et al., 2009; Bothrops itapetiningae – Carrasco et al., 2012

= Bothrops itapetiningae =

Species of snake

Bothrops itapetiningae, or the São Paulo lancehead, is a species of venomous snake in the family Viperidae. It is endemic to the Cerrado region, savannas of central Brazil. It eats small mammals, lizards, amphibians, birds and centipedes.

== Distribution ==
It is found in the Brazilian states of Goiás, Minas Gerais, Mato Grosso and São Paulo. The type locality is Itapetininga, a municipality in the State of São Paulo.
