= Lacunal scales =

Lacunal scales are those scales that form the inner border of the loreal pit in crotaline snakes. Usually, these scales are large and also curve outward to form the outer border of the pit. In most cases the pit opening is triangular with one apex pointing back towards the eye. It is bordered above, below and in front by one or more supralacunals, sublacunals and prelacunals respectively.
