= List of venomous animals =

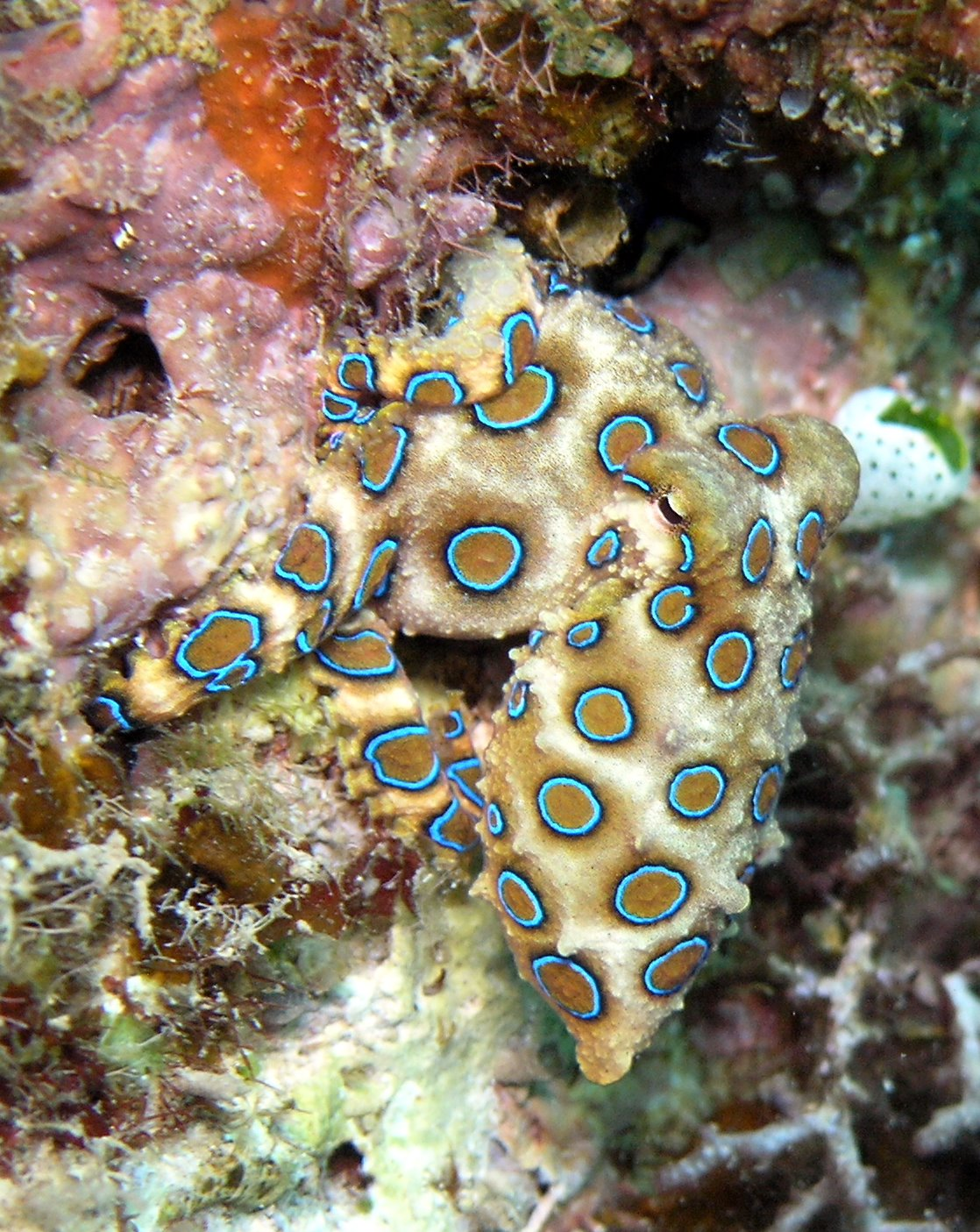
Many venomous animals, such as this greater blue-ringed octopus (Hapalochlaena lunulata), are brightly colored or can display bright colors to warn potential predators

Numerous animal species naturally produce chemical toxins which are used to kill or incapacitate prey or as a defense against predators. Venomous animals actively deliver their toxins (called venom) into their target through a specially designed mechanism, such as a bite or sting, by using a venom apparatus, such as fangs or a stinger, in a processes called envenomation. They are often distinguished from poisonous animals, which instead passively deliver their toxins (called poison) to their victims upon contact such as through inhalation, absorption through the skin, or after being ingested. The only difference between venomous animals and poisonous animals is how they deliver the toxins. This list deals exclusively with venomous animals.

Venoms have adapted to serve a wide variety of purposes. Their intended effects can range from mild fleeting discomfort to paralysis and death, and they may be highly selective in which species they target, often making them harmless to all but a few specific organisms; what may be fatal to one species may be totally insignificant to another species. Because the definition of "venomous" can be extremely broad, this list includes only those animals with venom that is known or suspected to be medically significant for humans or domestic animals.

== Invertebrates ==
=== Arthropods ===
==== Arachnids ====
Strictly speaking, all spiders and scorpions possess venom, though only a handful are dangerous to humans. Spiders typically deliver their venom with a bite from piercing, fang-like chelicerae; scorpions sting their victims with a long, curved stinger mounted on the telson.

===== Spiders =====
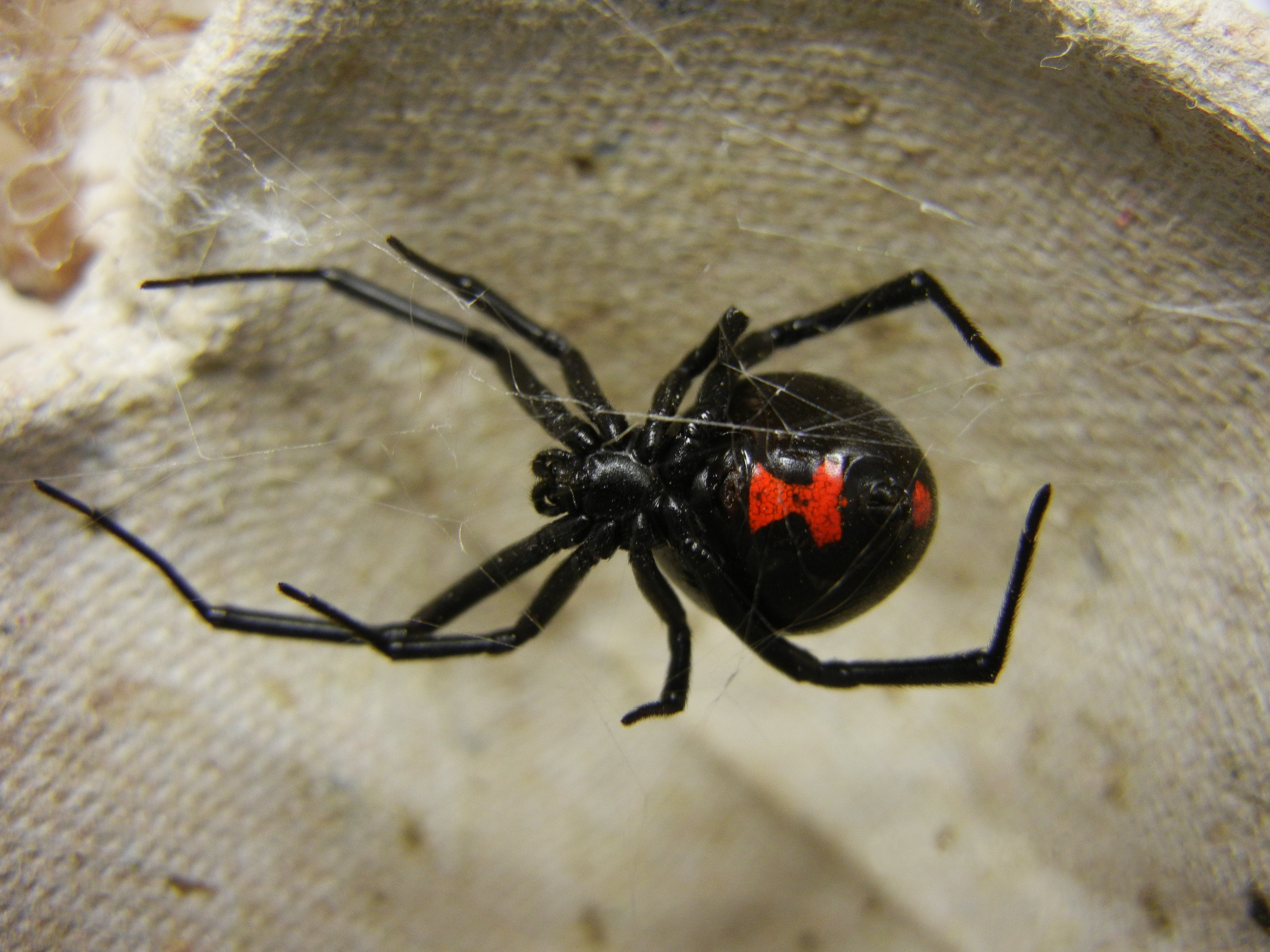
Latrodectus mactans, one of several venomous North American black widows

- Australian funnel-web spiders (Atrax and Hadronyche spp.)
- Brazilian wandering spiders (Phoneutria spp.)
- All widow spiders (Latrodectus spp.), including the black widows, button spiders, Australian redback spider (L. hasseltii), and the endangered katipō of New Zealand (L. katipo)
- False black widows (Steatoda spp.)
- All recluse spiders (Loxosceles spp.), including the brown recluse (L. reclusa) and Chilean recluse (L. laeta)
- Macrothele spp.
- Mouse spiders (Missulena spp.)
- Sicarius spp.
- Hexophthalma spp.
- All species of tarantula (in addition to chelicerae, some also have urticating hairs)

===== Scorpions =====
Of more than a thousand known species of scorpion, only a few dozen have venom that is dangerous to humans, most notably the bark scorpions, including:

- Centruroides spp.
- Deathstalker (Leiurus quinquestriatus)
- Central and South American Tityus, include the Brazilian yellow scorpion.
- Androctonus spp.
- Parabuthus spp.
- Hottentotta spp.

==== Insects ====
- Bees and wasps (see Bee sting)
- Some ants (see Ants of medical importance)
- Certain lepidopteran caterpillars are covered in urticating hairs for defense

==== Other arthropods ====
- Many species of centipede
- The remipede Xibalbanus tulumensis is a centipede-like crustacean that lives in underground anchialine caves of Mexico and Central America. Although blind, it is a formidable predator and feeds on the shrimp that share its underground pools.

=== Molluscs ===
- Cone snails of the family Conidae are a diverse group of predatory marine gastropods, mostly tropical in distribution, which hunt and immobilize prey using a modified harpoon-like radular tooth that can deliver neurotoxic conopeptides. All cone snails are venomous, though the danger posed to humans varies widely by species.

Many species of octopus, squid, and cuttlefish make use of venom when hunting their prey.

- The blue-ringed octopodes (Hapalochlaena spp.) produce tetrodotoxin, which is extremely toxic to even the healthiest adult humans, though the number of actual fatalities they have caused is far lower than the number caused by spiders and snakes, with which human contact is more common.

=== Cnidarians ===
- Jellyfish sting using microscopic cells called nematocysts, which are capsules full of venom expelled through a microscopic lance. Contact with a jellyfish tentacle can trigger millions of nematocysts to pierce the skin and inject venom.
- Some hydrozoans, including the Portuguese man o' war (Physalia physalis)
- Some sea anemones
- Some corals

=== Echinoderms ===
- Several species of sea urchins are venomous. The toxins are injected through their spines or pedicellariae.

=== Chaetognathans ===
- Chaetognathans, known as arrow worms, use the grasping spines in front of their mouth to catch prey and inject them with tetrodotoxin produced by symbiotic bacteria.

=== Annelids ===
Glyceridae, also called bloodworms, is a family of carnivorous polychaete worms which have an eversible proboscis equipped with four jaws connected to venom glands, used for killing the invertebrates they feed on.

== Vertebrates ==
=== Fish ===
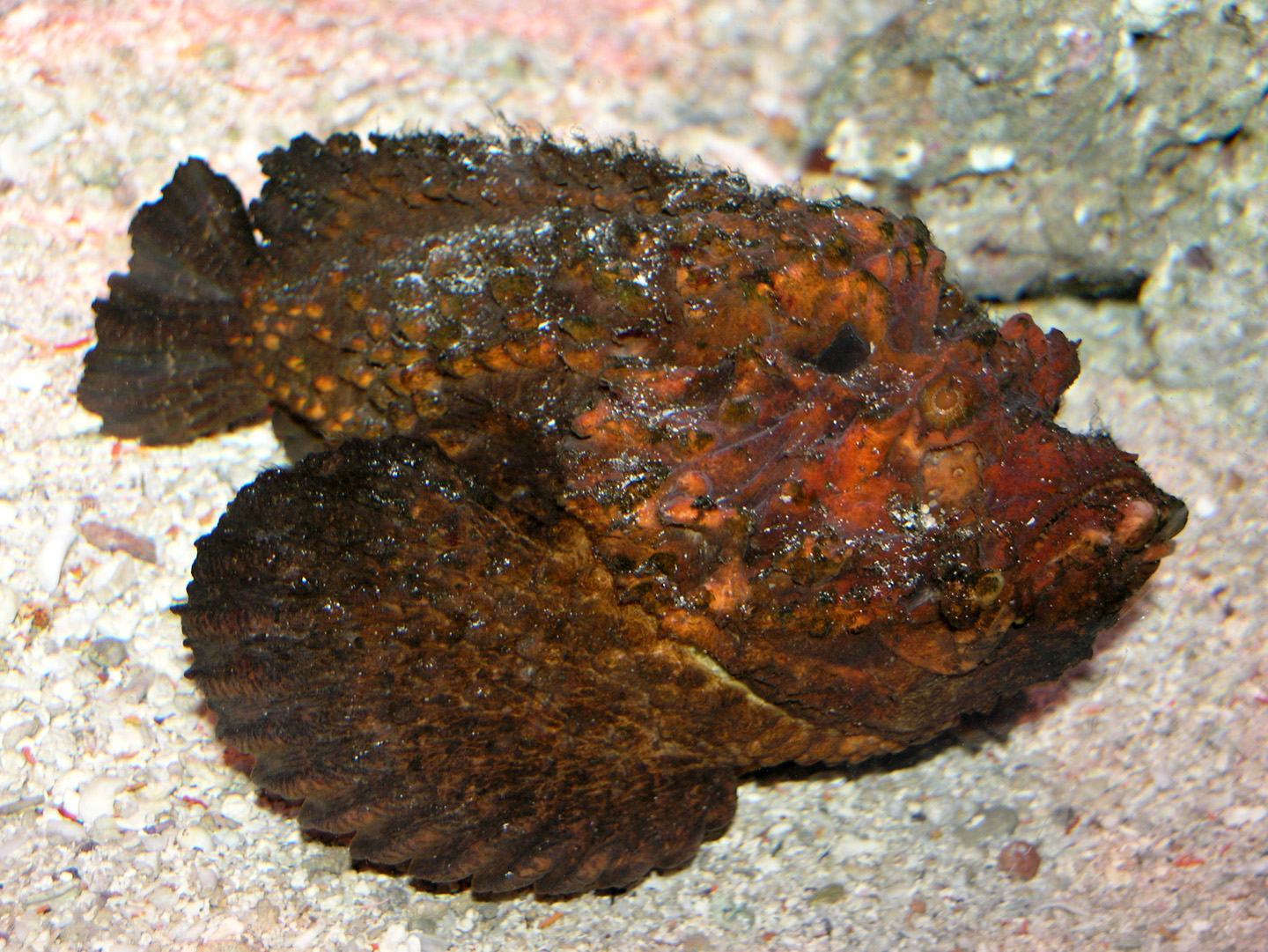
Synanceia verrucosa, a species of stonefish, is lined with dorsal spines that deliver an intensely painful and lethal venom. It is sometimes called the most venomous fish in the world.

There are at least 1,200 species of venomous fish, including:

- Stonefishes (Synanceia spp.)
- Lionfishes (Pterois spp.)
- Scorpionfishes
- Toadfishes (Daector and Thalassophryne spp.)
- Rabbitfishes (Siganus spp.)
- Goblinfishes (Glyptauchen panduratus and Inimicus spp.)
- Cockatoo waspfish (Ablabys taenianotus)
- Striped blenny (Meiacanthus grammistes)
- Stargazers
- Chimaeras
- Weevers (Echiichthys vipera and Trachinus spp.)
- Dogfish sharks
- Most stingrays
- Most catfish species have venomous "stings" behind their fins, including:
  - The estuary cobbler (Cnidoglanis macrocephalus)
  - The striped eel catfish (Plotosus lineatus) and other eeltail catfishes (Neosilurus spp.)
  - The Asian Stinging Catfish (Heteropneustes fossilis)

=== Reptiles ===
==== Snakes ====
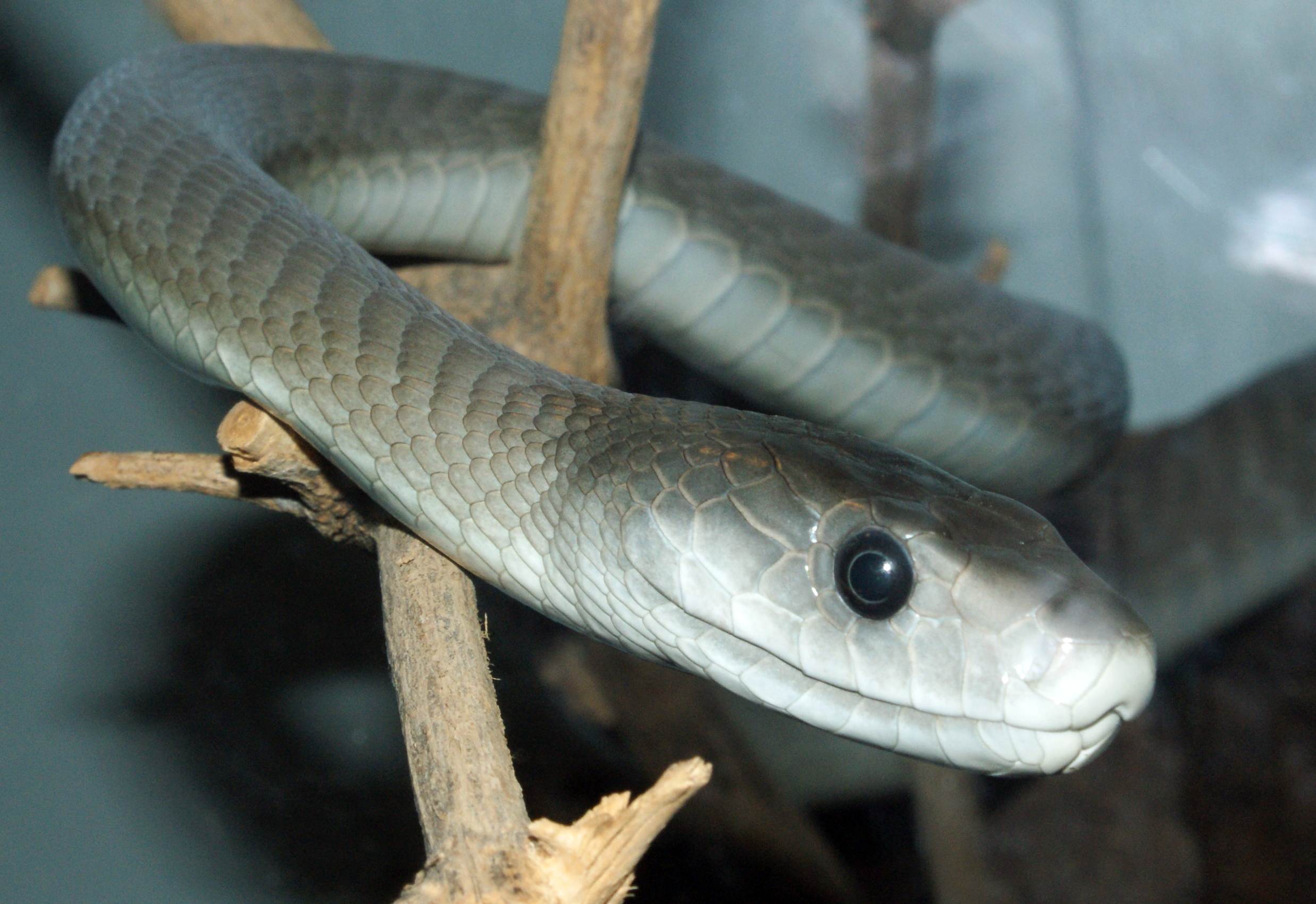
The black mamba has one of the deadliest bites of any snake

- Nearly all elapids, for example
  - Australian black snakes (Pseudechis)
  - All true cobras (Naja spp.), including the Indian cobra (Naja naja)
  - King cobra (Ophiophagus hannah)
  - Coral snakes (Micrurus, Leptomicrurus, and Micruroides spp.)
  - Belcher's sea snake (Hydrophis belcheri)
  - Dubois' sea snake (Aipysurus duboisii)
  - Brown snakes (Pseudonaja), including the eastern brown snake (Pseudonaja textilis)
  - Death adders (Acanthophis spp.)
  - Kraits (Bungarus spp.), including the common krait (Bungarus caeruleus)
  - Mambas (Dendroaspis spp.), including the black mamba (D. polylepis)
  - Taipans (Oxyuranus)
  - Tiger snakes (Notechis spp.)
- Vipers, for example
  - Bushmasters (Lachesis spp.)
  - Copperhead (Agkistrodon contortrix) and cottonmouth (Agkistrodon piscivorus)
  - Lanceheads (Bothrops spp.), including the fer-de-lance (B. lanceolatus) and the terciopelo (B. asper)
  - Rattlesnakes (Crotalus and Sistrurus spp.)
  - Russell's viper (Daboia russelii)
  - Saw-scaled viper (Echis carinatus)
- Boomslang (Dispholidus typus)

==== Lizards ====
- Gila monster (Heloderma suspectum)
- Mexican beaded lizard (Heloderma horridum)
- Some members of the genus Varanus, such as the Komodo dragon (V. komodoensis), perentie (V. giganteus), and lace monitor (V. varius)

==== Dinosaurs ====
Some scientists have proposed that Sinornithosaurus had a venomous bite, but later evidence suggests otherwise.

=== Amphibians ===
Though there are numerous poisonous amphibian species capable of secreting lethal toxins through their skin, relatively few amphibians are truly venomous.

==== Frogs ====
- Bruno's casque-headed frog (Aparasphenodon brunoi)
- Greening's frog (Corythomantis greeningi)

==== Salamanders ====
- Fire salamander (Salamandra salamandra)
- Iberian ribbed newt (Pleurodeles waltl)

==== Caecilians ====
- Typhlonectes compressicauda
- Siphonops annulatus

=== Mammals ===
Only a few modern mammal species are capable of producing venom; they are likely the last living examples of what was once a more common trait among the mammals. The definition of "venomous" becomes less distinct here, however, and whether some species are truly venomous is still debated.

- European mole (Talpa europaea)
- Platypus (Ornithorhynchus anatinus) (Note: The venom is produced only by the male and only during the breeding season.)
- Eurasian water shrew (Neomys fodiens)
- Mediterranean water shrew (Neomys anomalus)
- Northern short-tailed shrew (Blarina brevicauda)
- Southern short-tailed shrew (Blarina carolinensis)^{[disputed]}
- Elliot's short-tailed shrew (Blarina hylophaga)^{[disputed]}
- Both species of solenodon, the Cuban solenodon (Solenodon cubanus) and the Hispaniolan solenodon (S. paradoxus)
- Slow loris (Nycticebus spp.)
- Pygmy slow loris (Xanthonycticebus pygmaeus)

== See also ==
- Venomous mammals
- Venomous fish
- Venomous snakes
- Toxic birds
