= List of poisonous animals =

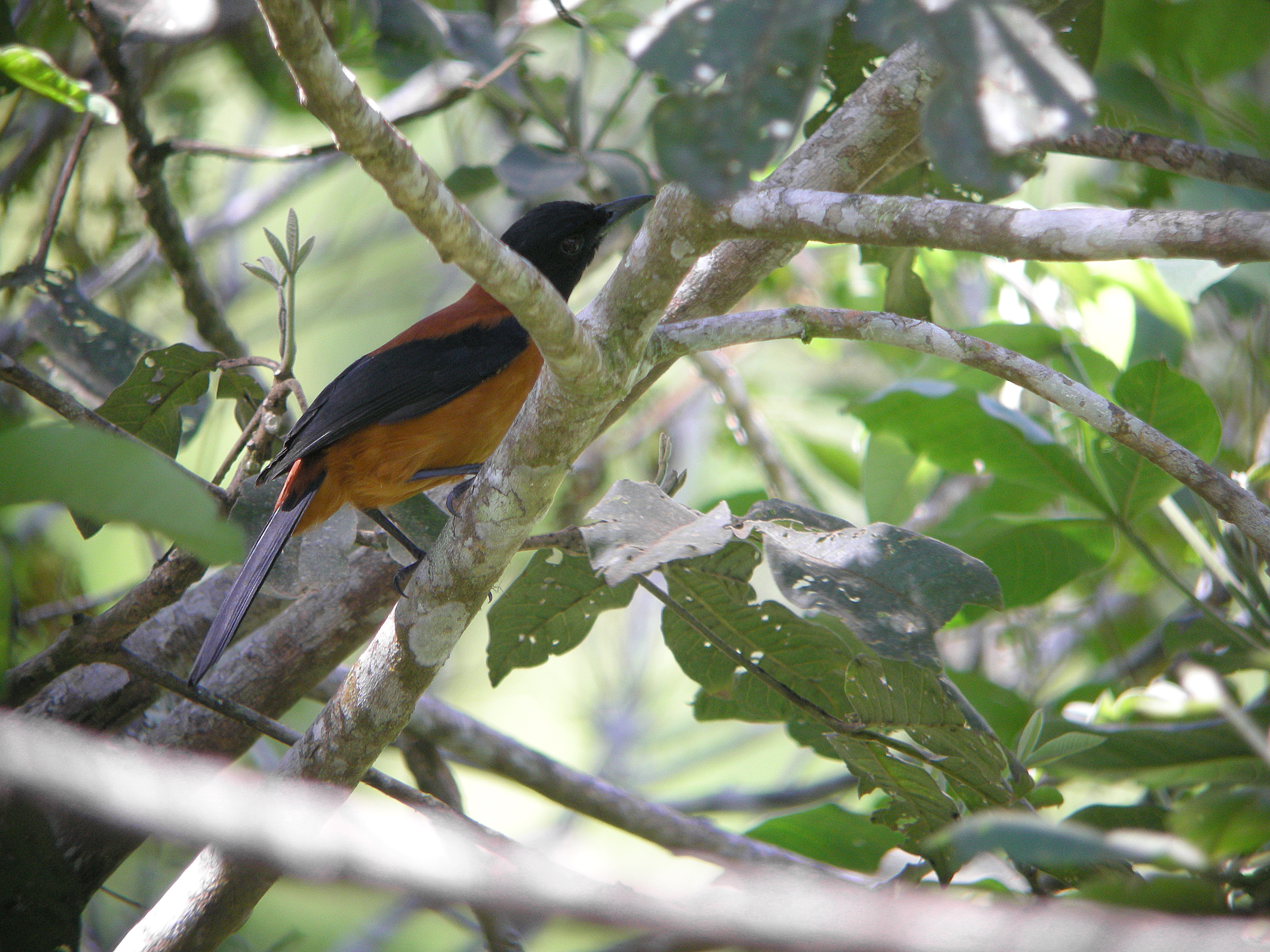
The hooded pitohui. The neurotoxin homobatrachotoxin on the birds' skin and feathers causes numbness and tingling on contact.

The following is a list of poisonous animals, which are animals that passively deliver toxins (called poison) to their victims upon contact such as through inhalation, absorption through the skin, or after being ingested. They are often distinguished from venomous animals, which actively inject their toxins (called venom) into their victims through a venom apparatus such as fangs or a stinger. The only difference between poisonous animals and venomous animals is how they deliver the toxins. This list deals exclusively with poisonous animals.

== Poisonous animals ==
This list is a partial list of animals that are poisonous to humans and other animals in that their flesh is toxic if consumed, or in some cases if they are touched:

=== Frogs and toads ===
==== Frogs ====
- Northern corroboree frog
- Southern corroboree frog
- Mantella
- Poison dart frog (diet dependent)
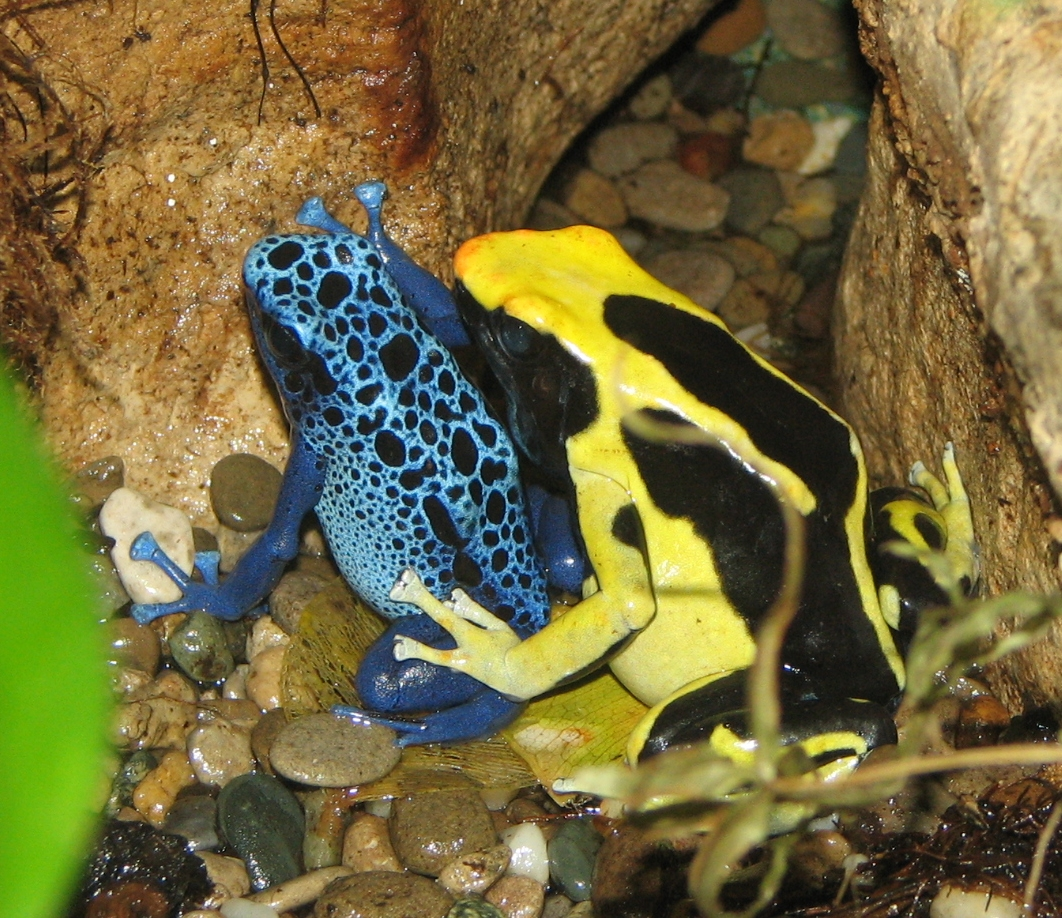
  The bright colors of poison dart frogs warn predators of their toxicity.

==== Toads ====
Some of these toads are "milked" for their bufotoxins.

- American toad
- Asiatic toad
- Cane toad
- Colorado River toad
- Common toad
- European green toad
- Fowler's toad

=== Mammals ===
- Slow loris (usually thought of as venomous, but they also lick their fur, making it toxic)

=== Birds ===
- Pitohui
- Blue-capped ifrit
- Shrikethrushes
- Spur-winged goose (diet-dependent)
- Common quail (diet-dependent)
- Carolina parakeet
- Zhenniao (possibly mythical)

=== Snakes ===
- Rhabdophis keelback snakes
- Garter snake (diet-dependent, when feeding on Pacific newts)

=== Salamanders ===
- Pacific newts or Western newts

=== Fish ===
- Tetraodontidae (Blowfish, Pufferfish)
- Greenland shark
- Barracuda (age and diet dependent)

=== Cephalopods ===
- Blue-ringed octopus
- Pfeffer's flamboyant cuttlefish

=== Insects ===
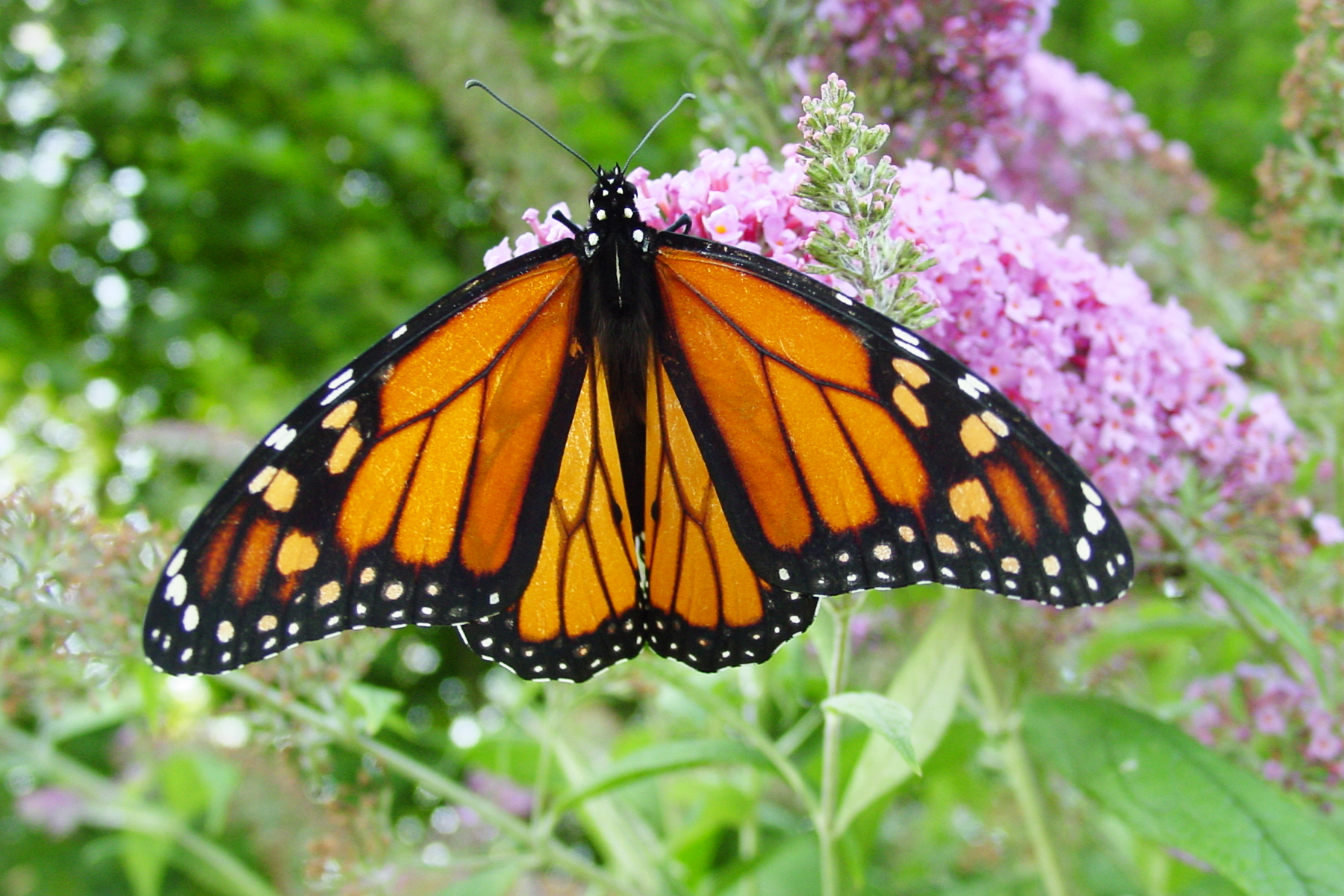
Most birds dislike the taste of monarch butterflies; they contain toxins from poisonous milkweed, ingested as caterpillars.

- Blister beetle
- Diamphidia
- Cinnabar moth
- Certain tiger moths (Erebidae)
- Birdwings
- Milkweed butterflies (include Monarch butterfly)
- Battus (butterfly)

=== Crustaceans ===
- Gorilla crabs (Xanthidae)

=== Cnidarians ===
- Some members of the genus Palythoa produce the highly toxic palytoxin
- Rhodactis species

=== Echinoderms ===
- It is common for sea cucumbers like Pearsonothuria graeffei to protect itself with toxins
- Actinopyga agassizii a toxic sea cucumber
- Some starfish, like Plectaster decanus, are poisonous

=== Annelids ===
- The polychaete worm Hediste diversicolor
- Halla parthenopeia

=== Nemerteans ===
- Antarctonemertes valida is one of several nemerteans which make use of defensive toxic secretions

=== Flatworms ===
- Bipalium kewense, the hammerhead flatworm, is coated in toxic mucus

=== Sponges ===
- Negombata magnifica, the toxic finger-sponge, is one of many toxic species of sponges

=== Placozoans ===
- Trichoplax use large specialized cells to release antipredatory toxins

== See also ==
- Poisonous amphibians
- Toxic birds
- List of venomous animals
- List of poisonous plants
- List of poisonous fungi
