= Poisonous amphibian =

Amphibians that produce poison

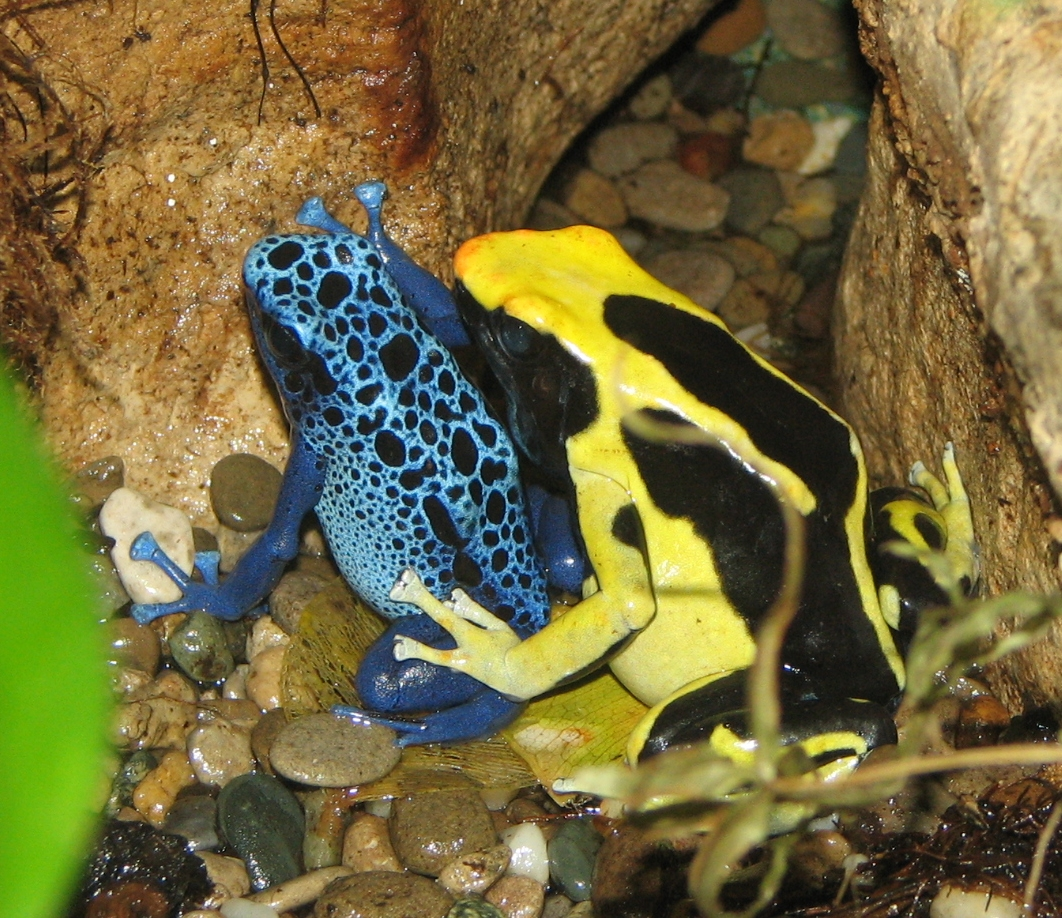
Poison dart frogs are well known for their brightly colored skin. The bright colors warn potential predators of their toxicity.

Poisonous amphibians are amphibians that produce toxins to defend themselves from predators.

== Amphibians ==
Most toxic amphibians are poisonous to touch or eat. These amphibians usually sequester toxins from animals and plants on which they feed, commonly from poisonous insects or poisonous plants. Except certain salamandrid salamanders that can extrude sharp venom-tipped ribs, and two species of frogs with venom-tipped bone spurs on their skulls, amphibians are not known to actively inject venom.

=== Toxic Frogs and Toads ===
An example of poison ingestion derives from the poison dart frog. They get a deadly chemical called lipophilic alkaloid from consuming a poisonous food in the rainforest. They are immune to the poison and they secrete it through their skin as a defense mechanism against predators. This poison is so efficient, the native people of the South American Amazon rainforest use the frogs' toxins on their weapons to kill their prey, giving the frogs their nickname the "poison dart frog".

Image	Scientific name	Active agent	Distribution
	Dendrobatidae Poison Dart Frogs	lipophilic alkaloid toxins: allopumiliotoxin 267A, batrachotoxin, epibatidine, histrionicotoxin, pumiliotoxin 251D	humid, tropical environments of Central and South America
	Leptodactylidae or southern frogs	biogenic amines: leptodactyline, tryptamines (5-HT, 5-HO-NMT, 5-HTQ, dehydrobufotenine), histamine, NMH, others	Neotropical frogs
	Mantella genus Golden frogs or Malagasy poison frogs	alkaloid toxins	Madagascar
	northern corroboree frog (Pseudophryne pengilleyi)	pseudo-phrynamine	Southern Tablelands of Australia.
	southern corroboree frog (Pseudophryne corroboree)	pseudo-phrynamine	Southern Tablelands of Australia.
	Bruno's casque-headed frog (Aparasphenodon brunoi)	Unknown injectable venom	Brazil
	Greening's frog (Corythomantis greeningi)	Unknown injectable venom	Brazil
	Panamanian golden frog (Atelopus zeteki)	Zetekitoxin AB, Bufadienolide	Central Panama.
	American toad (Anaxyrus americanus)	Bufotoxin	eastern United States and Canada.
	Colorado River toad (Incilius alvarius)	5-MeO-DMT, Bufotenin	southeastern California, New Mexico, Mexico and much of southern Arizona
	Rhinella arenarum	Bufotoxin	Argentina from the Chubut Province northward, Bolivia east of the Andes, southern Brazil, and Uruguay
	Asian giant toad (Phrynoidis asper)	Bufotoxin	Mainland Southeast Asia and the Greater Sundas.
	Colombian giant toad, Blomberg's toad (Rhaebo blombergi)	Bufotoxin	western Colombia (Chocó, Valle del Cauca, Cauca, and Nariño Departments) and northwestern Ecuador (Carchi, Esmeraldas, and Imbabura Provinces)
	western toad (Anaxyrus boreas)	Bufotoxin	western British Columbia and southern Alaska south through Washington, Oregon, and Idaho to northern Baja California, Mexico; east to Montana, western and central Wyoming, Nevada, the mountains and higher plateaus of Utah, and western Colorado.
	common toad, European toad Bufo bufo	bufotalin, bufalitoxin and bufotoxin	Europe
	Asiatic toad or Chusan Island toad (Bufo gargarizans)	Bufotoxin	East Asia.
	African common toad or guttural toad (Sclerophrys gutturalis)	Bufotoxin	Angola, Botswana, Democratic Republic of the Congo, Kenya, Lesotho, Malawi, Mauritius, Mozambique, Namibia, Réunion, Somalia, South Africa, Ethiopia, Eswatini, Tanzania, Zambia, and Zimbabwe.
	Japanese common toad, Japanese warty toad or Japanese toad (Bufo japonicus)	bufotalin, Bufotoxin	Japan and is present on the islands of Honshu, Hokkaido, Kyushu and Shikoku
	Fowler's toad (Anaxyrus fowleri)	Bufotoxin	eastern United States and parts of adjacent Canada
	cane toad (Rhinella marina)	Bufotoxin, Bufotenin	Rio Grande Valley in South Texas to the central Amazon and southeastern Peru, and some of the continental islands near Venezuela (such as Trinidad and Tobago) Introduced in Australia, Florida and Hawaii, Papua New Guinea, the Philippines, the Ogasawara, Ishigaki Island and the Daitō Islands of Japan, most Caribbean islands, Fiji and many other Pacific islands
	Asian common toad (Duttaphrynus melanostictus)	Bufotoxin	South and Southeast Asia.
	Peltophryne peltocephala	Bufotoxin	Cuba
	oak toad (Anaxyrus quercicus)	Bufotoxin	southeastern United States.
	African common toad, square-marked toad, African toad (Sclerophrys regularis)	Bufotoxin	Angola, Benin, Burkina Faso, Cameroon, Cape Verde, Central African Republic, Chad, Republic of the Congo, Democratic Republic of the Congo, Ivory Coast, Egypt, Ethiopia, Gabon, Ghana, Guinea, Guinea-Bissau, Kenya, Liberia, Mali, Niger, Nigeria, Rwanda, Senegal, Sierra Leone, Sudan, and Uganda.
	Gulf Coast toad (Incilius valliceps)	Bufotoxin	eastern and southeastern Mexico and Central America as far south as Costa Rica.
	European green toad (Bufotes viridis)	Bufotoxin	mainland Europe, ranging from far eastern France and Denmark to the Balkans and Western Russia.

=== Toxic Salamanders ===
Image	Scientific name	Active agent	Distribution
	Taricha genus Western Newt	Tetrodotoxin	Pacific coastal region from southern Alaska to southern California, and Mexico
	Triturus genus crested and the marbled newts	Tetrodotoxin	Great Britain through most of continental Europe to westernmost Siberia, Anatolia, and the Caspian Sea region
	Notophthalmus genus	Tetrodotoxin	eastern United States, Mexico
	Salamandra genus	samandarin, samandarone, O-acetylsamandarine	southern and central Europe
	Iberian ribbed newt (Pleurodeles waltl)	Unknown	central and southern Iberian Peninsula and Morocco.

== Recreational ingestion of toxins ==
Some people use the bufotoxins of some species of toxic toads as a drug to get high, but this can become very dangerous. Usually due to the toads' size and toxicity, the poisons would not be deadly to a fully grown, healthy adult. But if too much of the toxin is absorbed, or if the person is young or ill, then the poisons can become a serious threat. It also depends on species: some amphibians do have toxins strong enough to kill even a healthy mature person within just a few minutes, while other species may not have toxins potent enough to have any effect. Licking toads is not biologically practical. For these tryptamines to be orally activated, the human monoamine oxidase system must be inhibited. Therefore, licking a poisonous amphibian will not guarantee a sufficient dose.

== See also ==
- Psychoactive toad
- Poisonous fish
- List of poisonous animals
- Toxic birds
- Venomous fish
- Venomous mammals
- Venomous snakes
- List of venomous animals
