= Toxic bird =

Birds that are poisonous to touch and eat

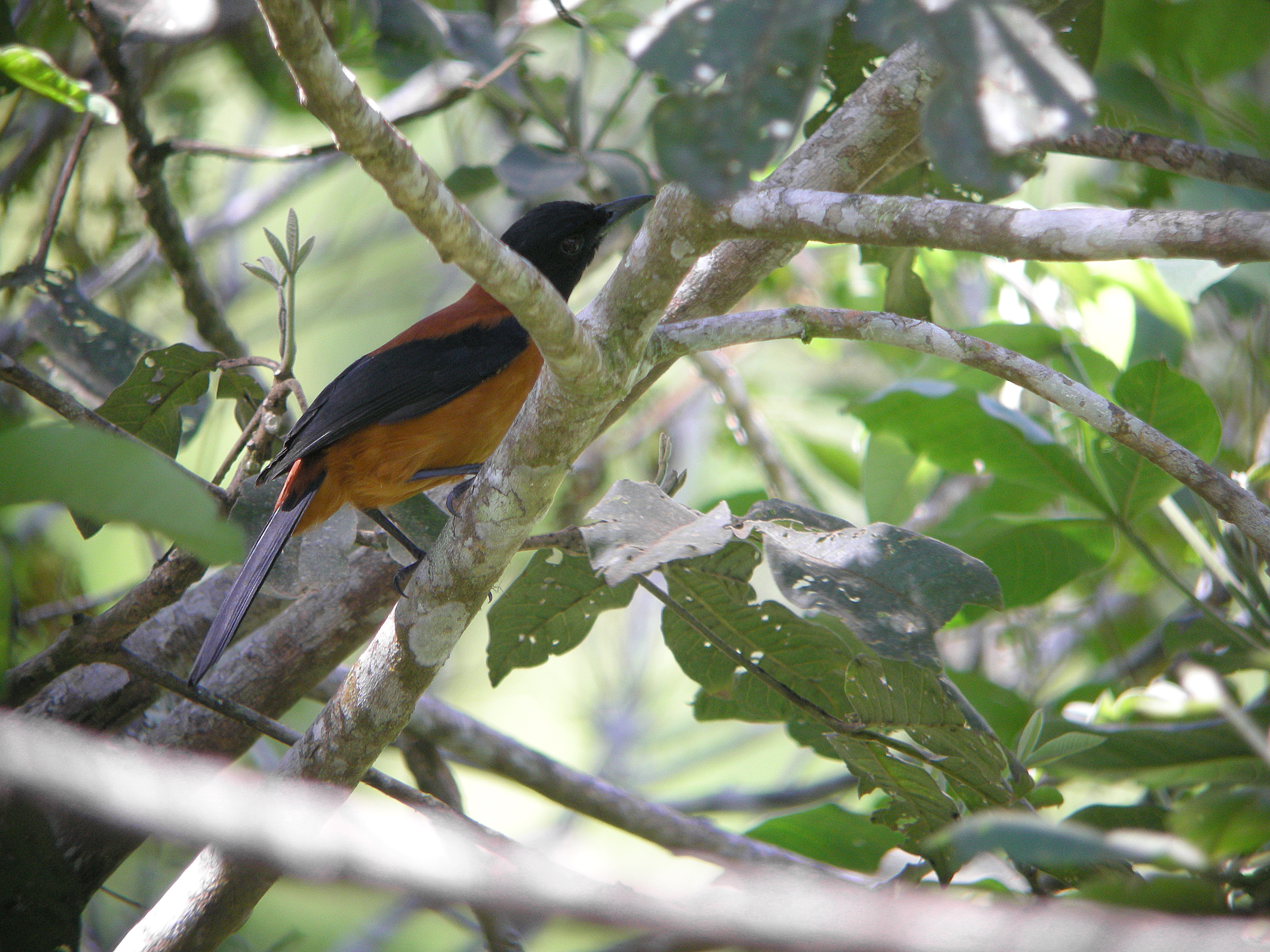
The hooded pitohui. A neurotoxin called homobatrachotoxin found in its skin and feathers causes numbness and tingling upon touching.

Toxic birds are birds that use toxin to defend themselves from predators. Although no known bird actively injects or produces venom, toxic birds sequester poison from animals and plants they consume, especially poisonous insects. Species include the pitohui and ifrita birds from Papua New Guinea, the European quail, the spur-winged goose, hoopoes, the bronzewing pigeon, and the red warbler.

The pitohui, the ifrita, and the rufous or little shrikethrush all sequester batrachotoxin in their skin and feathers. The African spur-winged goose is toxic to eat as it sequesters poison in its tissues, from the blister beetles that it feeds on. European quail are also known to be toxic and are able to cause coturnism at certain stages in their migrations.

== Initial research ==
The first research done on toxic birds was published in 1992 by Dumbacher et al., which found traces of the neurotoxin homobatrachotoxin, a steroid alkaloid with the ability to polarize Na+ channels, in the feathers and body tissue of many species of New Guinea passerine birds of the genus Pitohui and Ifrita. Before 1992, the toxins of the passerine birds of New Guinea had only been found in three species of poison dart frogs in Western Colombia (Phyllobates terribilis, Phyllobates bicolor, Phyllobates aurotaenia). Phyllobates kept in captivity do not develop the toxins, and the extent of the toxicity varies both in the pitohuis across their range. Both of these facts suggest that the toxins are obtained from diet. Toxic insects, primarily beetles, in the diets of these toxic birds are the most common sources for the bird’s toxicity. In the New Guinea bird species of Pitohui and Ifrita, the beetles of genus Choresine, natively known as nanisani, are pivotal food sources, and toxin sources, of these birds.

== Use of toxins ==
Poison is the only form of toxic weaponry that has evolved within birds, and it appears to have been gained in particular independent clusters of avian lineages (e.g., Pitohui and Ifrita). These clusters appear near the tips of the phylogeny which, combined with the higher rate of loss than gain, suggests that many lineages have likely evolved the ability to sequester poisons through time, but have subsequently lost that ability. It is hypothesized that this chemical defence is effectively used against predators such as snakes, raptors, and some arboreal marsupials. It is also hypothesized that skin/feather toxicity is used as a defence against ectoparasites. Batrachotoxins have been found to be poisonous to distantly related orders of insects, which suggests that batrachotoxins may well be effective against a wide range of ectoparasitic arthropods.

These ectoparasites have been found to play a role in the reproduction of birds in the genus Pitohui and Ifrita, in which their presence on the host increases time and energy spent during reproduction periods. The development of batrachotoxin in toxic birds has led to an advantage of these birds against ectoparasites, as they deter parasites from finding sanctuary on bird body tissue and feathers with the toxin, which suggests ectoparasites to be an important evolutionary force in sexual selection.

== Origins of batrachotoxins in birds ==
The search for batrachotoxins in organisms consumed by birds has yet to indicate an exogenous source. Stomach content studies reveal a variety of arthropods, mostly insects, and occasional fruits, but chemical analyses of these materials fail to reveal the presence of toxins. One can only speculate on sources of avian batrachotoxins if they are not synthesized de novo. The occurrence of batrachotoxins in muscle, viscera, and deep regions of the skin argues against these substances being topically applied, i.e., through “anting,” a behavior common in passerines where arthropods, fruits, or other materials are smeared directly onto the plumage. Perhaps birds sequester batrachotoxins produced by microorganisms in a way analogous to that in which pufferfish may obtain tetrodotoxin, another neurotoxin, from bacteria in their skin.

== See also ==
- List of poisonous animals
- Poisonous amphibians
- List of venomous animals
- Venomous snake
- Venomous fish
- Venomous mammals
- Zhenniao
