= Venomous mammal =

Venom-producing mammals

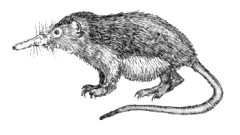
The Cuban solenodon (Atopogale cubana) has a venomous bite.

Venomous mammals are mammals that produce venom, which they use to kill or disable prey, to defend themselves from predators or conspecifics or in agonistic encounters. Mammalian venoms form a heterogeneous group with different compositions and modes of action, from four orders of mammals: Eulipotyphla, Monotremata, Primates, and Chiroptera. To explain the rarity of venom delivery in Mammalia, Mark Dufton of the University of Strathclyde has suggested that modern mammalian predators do not need venom because they are able to kill quickly with their teeth or claws, whereas venom, no matter how sophisticated, requires time to disable prey.

In spite of the rarity of venom among extant mammals, venom may be an ancestral feature among mammals, as venomous spurs akin to those of the modern platypus are found in most non-therian Mammaliaformes groups.

Venom is much more common among other vertebrates; there are many more species of venomous reptiles (e.g. venomous snakes) and fish (e.g. stonefish). Some birds are poisonous to eat or touch (e.g. hooded pitohui) though no bird species is known to be venomous. There are only a few species of venomous amphibians; certain salamandrid salamanders can extrude sharp venom-tipped ribs.

== Definitions ==
Several definitions of venomous animals have been proposed.

Bücherl states that venomous animals must possess at least one venom gland, a mechanism for excretion or extrusion of the venom, and apparatus with which to inflict wounds.

Mebs writes that venomous animals produce venom in a group of cells or gland, and have a tool, the venom apparatus, which delivers the venom by injection during a bite or sting. The venom apparatus in this definition encompasses both the gland and the injection device, which must be directly connected.

Fry et al. found that a venom is a secretion produced in a specialized gland in one animal and delivered to a target animal through the infliction of a wound. This secretion must contain molecules that disrupt normal physiological processes so as to facilitate feeding or defense by the producing animal. Additionally, the feeding secretion of hematophagous specialists (e.g. vampire bats) may be regarded as a specialized subtype of venom.

== Evolutionary history and paleontology ==
Venomous mammals may have been more common in the past. Extratarsal spurs observed in extinct Mesozoic mammals are homologous with those seen in extant monotremes, and this feature was widespread. Whether or not these extratarsal spurs served as a venom delivery system is up for debate. While species such as Gobiconodon and Zhangeotherium possessed an extratarsal spur, they are hypothesized to be nonvenomous due to the lack of the spur being hollow or channeled, as seen in modern venomous Ornithorhynchus. Whether or not the lack of venom is due to the loss of a basal trait is difficult to determine with current fossil records.

In 2005, Fox and Scott presented evidence of a venom delivery system in late Paleocene fossils found in Alberta. Bisonalveus browni was a small eutherian in the order Cimolesta. Fox and Scott argue that the anterior grooves of the upper canines in B. browni serve as venom channels. They also present a group of isolated lower mammalian teeth of unknown species that also feature these grooves. These specimens were reexamined and rejected on the basis that the evidence provided may not be enough to prove the presence of venom in these species. Fox and Scott found no fossa that would be indicative of the presence of a venom gland. Also, grooved teeth are a feature of many species of nonvenomous mammals, so the presence of grooved teeth alone is not indicative of venom. There is no phylogenetic support for the presence of venom in B. browni.

The genus Beremendia may have featured individuals with a venom delivery system. The first lower incisor of several species exhibited a groove that may have served as a canal for venom to travel from a venom gland to the tip of the tooth. Support for a venom gland is seen in the fossa in the mandibular symphysis. Also, Beremendia is phylogenetically close to Solenodon, which has extant members that are venomous. Euchambersia is an example of a fossil therapsid (a relative of mammals) with grooved teeth, and maxillary fossa to match, indicating the presence of venom glands. Euchambersia differs in that the upper canines are the teeth that are grooved, and the grooves are almost enclosed, forming a tube.

More recently, nonhomologous species in the genus Nesophontes were hypothesized to be venomous. Species within Nesophontes exhibit grooved upper canines, similar to other species suspected of venom delivery. Where Nesophontes differ, however, is in the presence of grooves on the first and second upper premolars. The grooves are similar in morphology to helodermatid lizards, which feature a deep anterior groove and shallow posterior groove, as well as grooves on other teeth, which suggests that Nesophontes grooved premolars also aided in delivery of venom in addition to the upper canines. Nesophontes mandibular morphology is similar to that of existing venomous Eulipotyphlans, which further supports the hypothesis that they possessed venom.

== Examples ==
=== Eulipotyphla (previously known as insectivores) ===
Vampire bats and Eulipotyphla are the only mammals so far observed to produce toxic saliva. These species have significantly enlarged and granular submaxillary salivary glands from which the toxic saliva is produced.

The Cuban solenodon (Atopogale cubana) and Hispaniolan solenodon (Solenodon paradoxus) look similar to large shrews. They both have venomous bites; the venom is delivered from modified salivary glands via grooves in their second lower incisors. Recent study has identified the gene regulatory network responsible for the development of venom delivery systems in these small mammals. Due to the overexpression of kallikreins in their saliva, solenodon bites cause vasodilation and may result in circulatory shock. It was reported that death was frequent among Hispaniolan solenodons kept together in the same enclosure, with bite marks on their feet being the only observable cause. Such use in competition may be a secondary aspect of the insectivore venom.

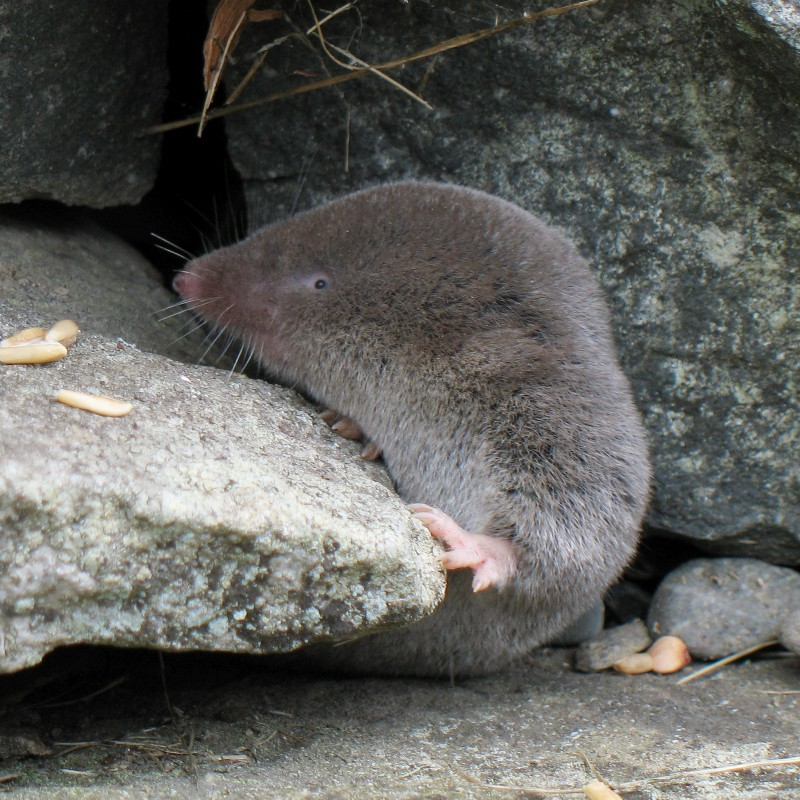
The northern short-tailed shrew is one of several venomous shrews.

The northern short-tailed shrew (Blarina brevicauda), Mediterranean water shrew (Neomys anomalus), and Eurasian water shrew (Neomys fodiens) are capable of delivering a venomous bite. Other American short-tailed shrews—the southern short-tailed shrew (Blarina carolinensis), Elliot's short-tailed shrew (Blarina hylophaga), and Everglades short-tailed shrew (Blarina peninsulae) and the Transcaucasian water shrew (Neomys teres)—possibly also have a venomous bite. Shrews cache various prey in a comatose state, including earthworms, insects, snails, and to a lesser extent, small mammals such as voles and mice. This behaviour is an adaption to winter. In this context, the shrew venom acts as a tool to sustain a living hoard, thus ensuring food supply when capturing prey is difficult. This is especially important considering the high metabolic rate of shrews. Arguments against this suggest that the venom is used as a tool to hunt larger prey. Insectivores have an enhanced dependence on vertebrate food material, which is larger and more dangerous than their power to weight ratio would allow, thus requiring an extra asset to overcome these difficulties. Extant shrews do not have specialized venom delivery apparatus. Their teeth do not have channels, but a concavity on the first incisors may collect and transmit saliva from the submaxillary ducts, which open near the base of these teeth.

The European mole (Talpa europaea), and possibly other species of mole, have toxins in their saliva that can paralyze earthworms, allowing the moles to store them alive for later consumption.

=== Male platypus ===
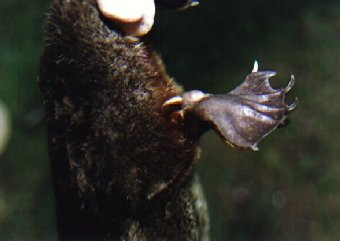
The calcareous spur found on the male platypus's hind limb is used to deliver venom.

Both male and female platypuses (Ornithorhynchus anatinus) hatch with keratinised spurs on the hind limbs, although the females lose these during development. The spurs are connected to the venom-producing crural glands, forming the crural system. During the mating season these glands become highly active, producing venom to be delivered by the channeled spur. Echidnas, the other monotremes, have spurs but no functional venom glands. Although not potent enough to be lethal to humans, platypus venom is nevertheless so excruciating that victims may sometimes be temporarily incapacitated. Platypus envenomation was fairly common when the animal was still hunted for its fur. Nowadays any close contact with the animal is rare and restricted to biologists, zookeepers and anglers (who occasionally catch them in fishing lines or nets).

When platypuses attack, they drive their hind legs together with considerable force so that the spurs are embedded in the flesh caught between and if venom is being produced, a few milliliters are injected by repeated jabbing. The spurs have enough strength to support the weight of the platypus, which often hangs from the victim, requiring assistance for removal.

Most of the evidence now supports the proposition that the venom system is used by males on one another as a weapon when competing for females, taking part in sexual selection. During this season, males become more aggressive and are found with punctures in their bodies, especially in the tail region. Adult male platypuses largely avoid each other, outside of this mating rivalry.

Platypus venom is likely retained from its distant non-monotreme ancestors, being the last living example of what was once a common characteristic among mammals. Fossil records show that venom delivery systems were not sexually dimorphic in ancestral monotremes. It has been hypothesized that venom spurs were once used for defense against predators. Proteins derived from platypus venom are being studied for potential analgesic properties.

=== Vampire bats ===
The definition of venom by Fry et al. (see Definitions) regards the feeding secretions of hematophagous (blood eating) specialists as a particular subtype of venom. In this context, the subfamily Desmodontinae represents the venomous mammals from the order Chiroptera. This group comprises the most well known venomous bat, the common vampire bat (Desmodus rotundus) and two other rare species, the hairy-legged vampire bat (Diphylla ecaudata) and the white-winged vampire bat (Diaemus youngi). These bats produce toxic saliva with anticoagulant properties and have a series of anatomical and physiological adaptations to allow nourishment based solely on blood. The majority of their prey do not perish from the attack or contact with the venom.

=== Primates ===
Slow lorises (of the genera Nycticebus and Xanthonycticebus) are accepted as the only known venomous primate. Slow loris venom was known in folklore in their host countries throughout southeast Asia for centuries, but dismissed by Western science until the 1990s. There are nine recognised species of this small-bodied nocturnal primate. They possess a dual composite venom consisting of saliva and brachial gland exudate, a malodourous fluid forming from an apocrine sweat gland on the animal's forearm. Both fluids have been demonstrated as being venomous individually and creating a more potent venom when mixed. Slow loris brachial gland exudate (BGE) has been shown to possess up to 142 volatile components, and possesses a variant of the cat allergen protein Fel-D1. The BGE has several ecological functions including anti-parasitic defence and communication. Slow loris saliva has been shown to be cytotoxic to human skin cells in laboratory experiments without the administration of BGE.

The venom is administered through morphologically distinct dentition in the form of an adapted toothcomb. In the wild envenomation occurs from intraspecific competition; whereby two slow lorises fight for mates, food or territory. Slow loris inflicted wounds are a major cause of premature death in zoo and wildlife slow loris populations, often resulting in festering and necrotic wounds. Slow loris envenomation in humans is rare, but can result in near fatal anaphylactic shock. A suite of additional effects of the venom have been documented including mild to permanent disfigurement and mobility loss. The study of slow loris venom was brought to the public attention in 2012 by the research of the primatologist Prof. K.A.I Nekaris and in her BBC documentary The Jungle Gremlins of Java.

== Arguably venomous mammals ==
=== Eulipotyphla ===
Hedgehogs (Erinaceinae) anoint their spines with a range of toxic and irritating substances. They will sometimes kill toads (Bufo sp.), bite into the toads' poison glands and smear the toxic mixture on their spines.

=== Afrosoricida ===
Tenrecs, which are similar in appearance to hedgehogs but from a different line of evolutionary descent, may also have separately evolved self-anointing behaviour.

=== Rodentia ===
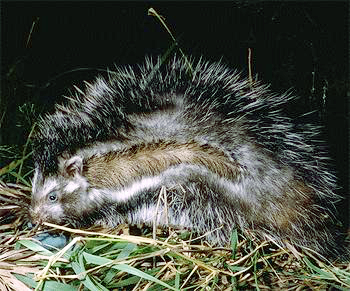
The African crested rat smears toxins on its flank hairs.

The African crested rat (Lophiomys imhausi) has a mane of long, coarse black-and-white banded hairs which extends from the top of the animal's head to just beyond the base of the tail. This mane is bordered by a broad, white-bordered strip of hairs covering an area of glandular skin on the flank. When the animal is threatened or excited, the mane erects and this flank strip parts, exposing the glandular area. The hairs in this flank area are highly specialised; at the tips they are like ordinary hair, but are otherwise spongy, fibrous, and absorbent. The rat is known to deliberately chew the roots and bark of the poison-arrow tree (Acokanthera schimperi), so-called because human hunters extract a toxin, ouabain, to coat arrows that can kill an elephant. After the rat has chewed the tree, it deliberately slathers the resulting mixture onto its specialised flank hairs which are adapted to rapidly absorb the poisonous mixture, acting like a lamp wick. It thereby creates a defense mechanism that can sicken or even kill predators which attempt to bite it.

== Chemical defence ==
Skunks (Mephitidae) can eject a noxious fluid from glands near their anus. It is not only foul smelling, but can cause skin irritation and, if it gets in the eyes, temporary blindness. Some members of the mustelid family, such as the striped polecat (Ictonyx striatus), also have this capacity to an extent. Pangolins can also emit a noxious smelling fluid from glands near the anus. The greater long-nosed armadillo can release a disagreeable musky odor when threatened.

== See also ==
- Venomous fish
- Toxicofera
- Toxic birds
- List of venomous animals
- Venomous snakes
- Poisonous amphibians
