= Platypus venom =

Venom produced by the platypus

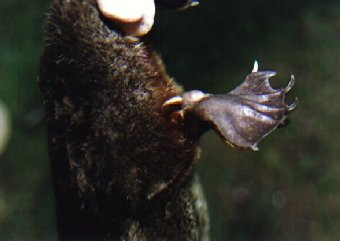
The venom-delivering spur is found only on the male's hind limbs.

The platypus is one of the few living mammals to produce venom. The venom is made in venom glands that are connected to hollow spurs on their hind legs; it is primarily made during the mating season. While the venom's effects are described as extremely painful, it is not lethal to humans. Many archaic mammal groups possess similar tarsal spurs, so it is thought that, rather than having developed this characteristic uniquely, the platypus simply inherited this characteristic from its ancestors. Rather than being a unique outlier, the platypus is the last demonstration of what was once a common mammalian characteristic, and it can be used as a model for non-therian mammals and their venom delivery and properties.

== Spur and crural gland ==
The venom is produced in the crural glands of the male, which are kidney-shaped alveolar glands located in the upper thigh, and delivered through a spur, or calcar, on each hind limb. Female platypuses, in common with echidnas, have rudimentary spur buds that do not develop (dropping off before the end of their first year) and lack functional crural glands. The spur is attached to a small bone that allows articulation; the spur can move at a right angle to the limb allowing a greater range of attack than a fixed spur would allow. The spur normally lies flat against the limb but is raised when required.

== Venom ==
The crural gland produces a venom secretion containing at least nineteen peptides and some non-nitrogenous components. Those peptides that have been sequenced and identified fall into three categories: defensin-like peptides (OvDLPs), C-type natriuretic peptides (OvCNPs), and nerve growth factor (OvNGF). The OvDLPs are related to, though distinct from, those involved in reptilian venom production. This appears to be an example of convergent evolution of venom genes from existing immune system genes (defensins). A unique feature of the venom is the presence of a D-amino acid. This is the only known such example in mammalian systems. This venom appears to be related to that of several species that are not part of the platypus's evolutionary lineage, such as certain fish, reptiles, insects, spiders, sea anemones, and starfish.

The different chemicals in the venom have a range of effects from lowering blood pressure to causing pain and increasing blood flow around the wound. Coagulating effects have been seen during experiments on laboratory animals, but this has not been observed consistently. Unlike snake venom, there appears to be no necrotising component in the platypus's venom. While some muscle wastage has been observed in cases of envenomation in humans, it is likely due to the inability to use the limb while the effects of the venom persist. It is unknown whether the pain caused is a result of the associated edema around the wound or the venom has a component that acts directly on the pain receptors.

The platypus venom has a broadly similar range of effects and is known to consist of a similar selection of substances to reptilian venom, but appears to have a different function from those poisons produced by lower vertebrates. The effects are not life-threatening but nevertheless powerful enough to cause serious impairment to the victim, which can lead to temporary paralysis. It is not used as a method of disabling or killing prey, more as a defensive mechanism. Only males produce this venom. Since production rises during the breeding season, it is theorised that the venom is used as an offensive weapon to assert dominance and to control territory during this period. While the platypus may use this characteristic for offensive mating purposes, they may have also adapted it for defensive techniques. Crocodiles, Tasmanian devils and raptors are known local predators to the platypus, all of which can be impacted by the venom.

== Effect on humans and other animals ==
Although powerful enough to paralyze smaller animals, the venom is not lethal to humans. Still, it produces excruciating pain that may be intense enough to incapacitate a victim. Swelling rapidly develops around the entry wound and gradually spreads outward. Information obtained from case studies shows that the pain develops into a long-lasting hyperalgesia that can persist for months but usually lasts from a few days to a few weeks. A clinical report from 1992 showed that the severe pain was persistent and did not respond to morphine.

In 1991 Keith Payne, a former member of the Australian Army and recipient of the Victoria Cross (Australia's highest award for valour), was struck on the hand by a platypus spur while trying to rescue the stranded animal. He described the pain as worse than being struck by shrapnel. A month later he was still experiencing pain in that hand. In 2006, Payne reported discomfort and stiffness when carrying out some physical activities such as using a hammer.

== See also ==
- Venomous mammal
