= Corythomantis botoque =

Scientific classification
- Kingdom: Animalia
- Phylum: Chordata
- Class: Amphibia
- Order: Anura
- Family: Hylidae
- Genus: Corythomantis
- Species: C. botoque

Binomial name
- Corythomantis botoque Marques, Haddad, and Garda, 2021

Species of frog

Corythomantis botoque is a species of frog in the family Hylinae. It is endemic to Brazil. Scientists have observed it in the Espinhaço Mountain Range between 315 and 940 meters above sea level.
