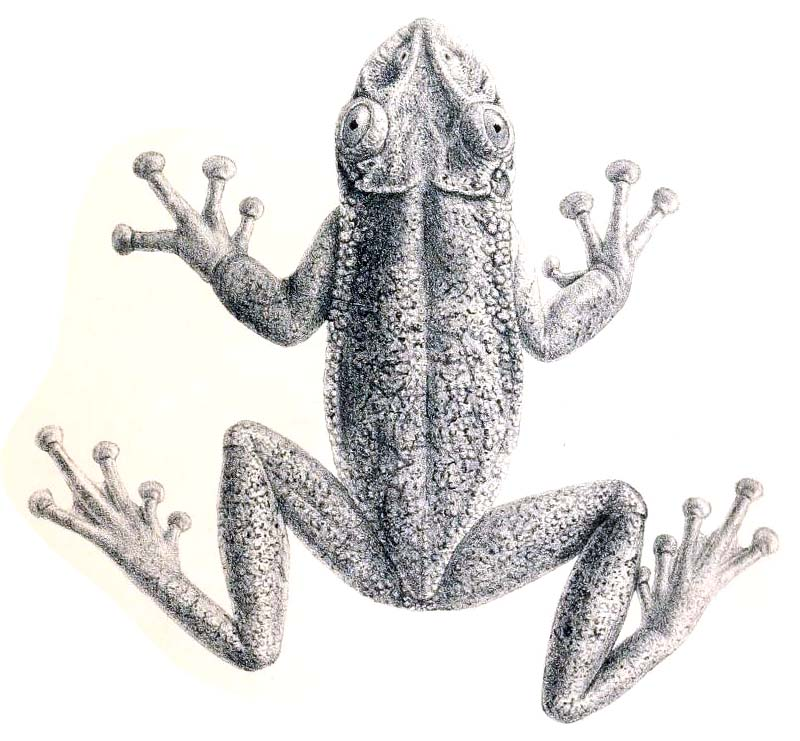
- Corythomantis greeningi

Scientific classification
- Domain: Eukaryota
- Kingdom: Animalia
- Phylum: Chordata
- Class: Amphibia
- Order: Anura
- Family: Hylidae
- Subfamily: Lophyohylinae
- Genus: Corythomantis; Boulenger, 1896

Type species
- Corythomantis greeningi Boulenger, 1896

Diversity
- 2 species (see text)

= Corythomantis =

Genus of amphibians

Corythomantis is a small genus of hylid frogs endemic to northeastern Brazil. It was monotypic until description of a second species, Corythomantis galeata in 2012, though this species was later moved to Nyctimantis. Corythomantis botoque was described in 2021. These frogs are sometimes known under common name Greening's frogs.

== Species ==
There are two species in this genus:

- Corythomantis botoque Marques, Haddad & Garda, 2021
- Corythomantis greeningi Boulenger, 1896
