= Venomous fish =

Fish that have the ability to produce toxins

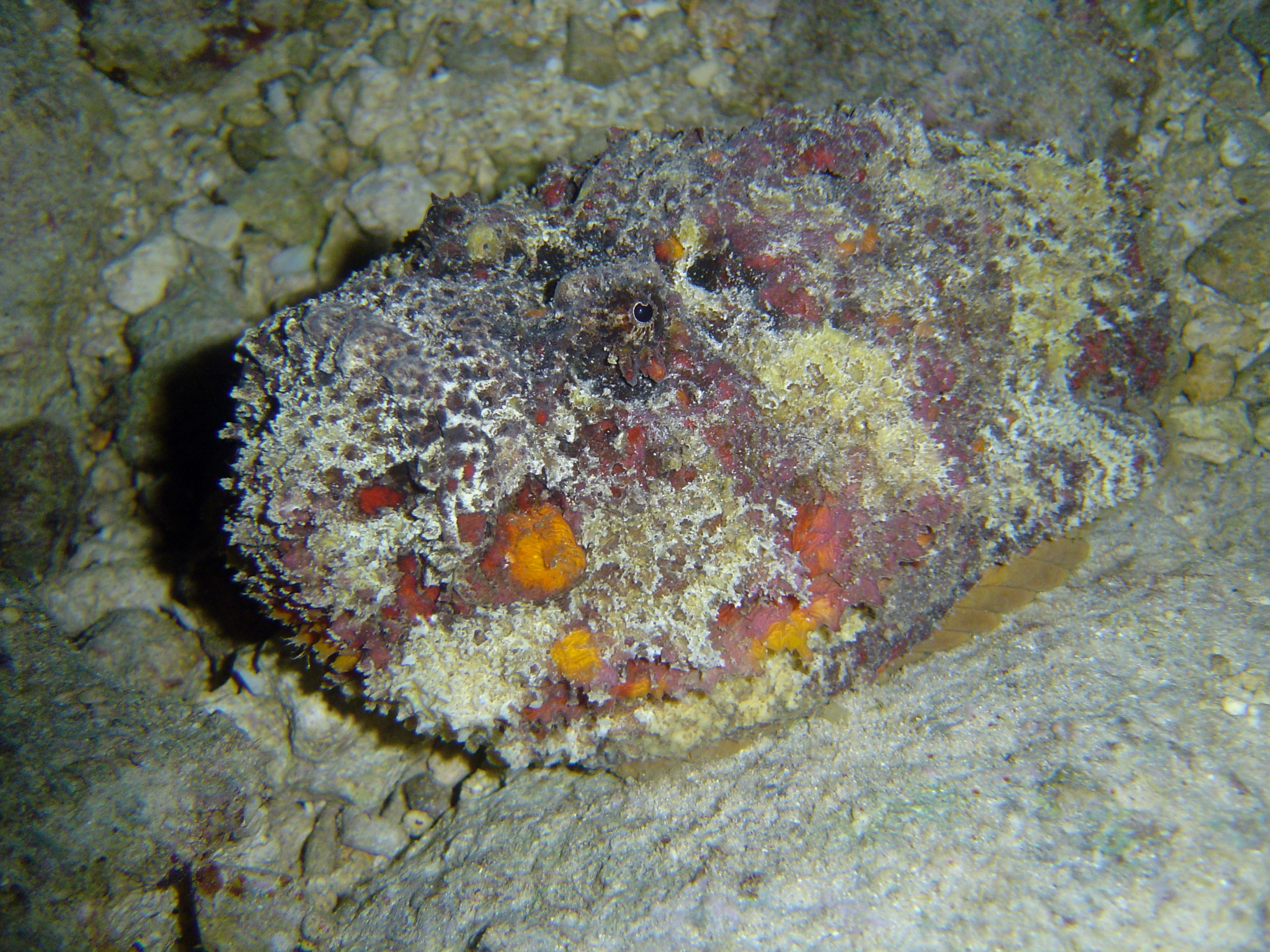
The most venomous known fish is the reef stonefish. It is an ambush predator which waits camouflaged on the bottom.

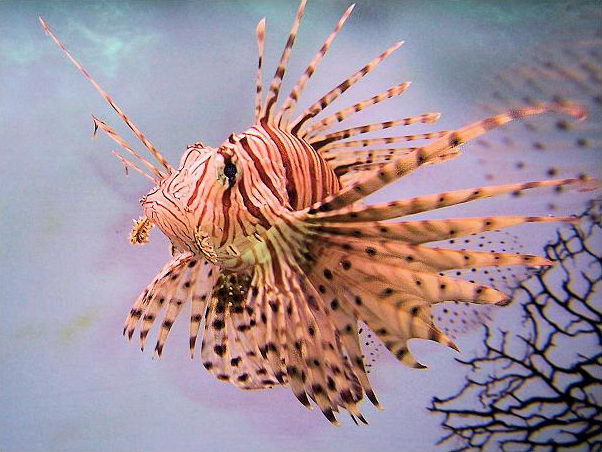
The highly visible lionfish uses venomous barbs around its body as a defence against predators.

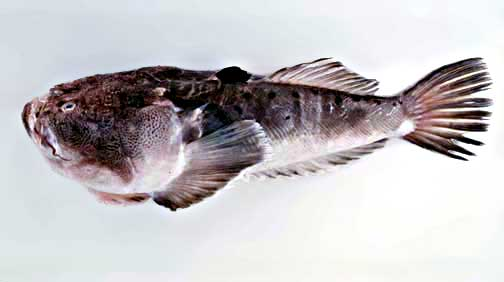
The stargazer buries itself out of sight. It can deliver electric shocks as well as venom.

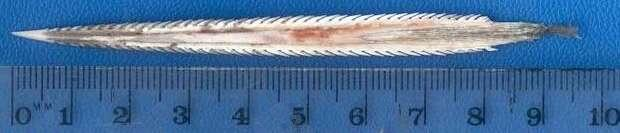
The stinger of a stingray

Venomous fish are species of fish which produce strong mixtures of toxins harmful to humans (called venom) which they deliberately deliver by means of a bite, sting, or stab, resulting in an envenomation. As a contrast, poisonous fish also produce a strong toxin, but they do not bite, sting, or stab to deliver the toxin, instead being poisonous to eat because the human digestive system does not destroy the toxin they contain in their bodies. Venomous fish do not necessarily cause poisoning if they are eaten, as the digestive system often destroys the venom.

There are at least 1200 species of venomous fish, with catfishes alone possibly contributing 250–625 species to that total. The former number accounts for two-thirds of the venomous vertebrate population. There are more venomous fish than venomous snakes and indeed more than the combined total of all other venomous vertebrates. Venomous fish are found in almost all habitats around the world, but mostly in tropical waters. Encounters with these species injure over 50,000 people every year.

Venomous fishes carry their venom in venom glands and use various delivery systems, such as spines or sharp fins, barbs, spikes and fangs. The most common venom delivery system is via dorsal spines. Venomous fish tend to be either very visible, using flamboyant colors to discourage predators from attacking them, or skillfully camouflaged and possibly buried in the sand. Apart from the value of improved self defense or capacity to kill prey, venom helps bottom dwelling fish by killing bacteria that could otherwise invade their skin. Few of these venoms have been studied. They are a yet-to-be tapped resource for bioprospecting to find drugs with medical uses.

== Examples ==
- The most venomous known fish is the reef stonefish. It has a remarkable ability to camouflage itself amongst rocks. It is an ambush predator that sits on the bottom waiting for prey to approach. Instead of swimming away if disturbed, it erects 13 venomous spines along its back. For defense it can shoot venom from each or all of these spines. Each spine is like a hypodermic needle, delivering the venom from two sacs attached to the spine. The stonefish has control over whether to shoot its venom, and does so when provoked or frightened. The venom results in severe pain, paralysis and tissue death, and can be fatal if not treated. Despite its formidable defenses, stonefish have predators. Some bottom feeding rays and sharks with crushing teeth feed on them, as does the Stokes' seasnake.
- The lionfish is a venomous coral reef fish. Unlike stonefish, a lionfish can release venom only if something strikes its spines. Although not native to the U.S. coast, lionfish have appeared around Florida and have spread up the coast to New York, possibly due to a hurricane washing captive specimens into natural waters. Lionfish can aggressively dart at scuba divers and attempt to puncture their facemask with their venomous spines.
- The stargazer buries itself and can deliver electric shocks as well as venom. It is a delicacy in some cultures (cooking destroys the venom), and can be found for sale in some fish markets with the electric organ removed. They have been called "the meanest things in creation"
- Stingrays can sting and cause an injury with their stinger, with such envenomations frequently occurring when people wade in shallow water and tread on them. Such encounters can be avoided by shuffling through the sand or stamping on the bottom, as the rays detect this and swim away. The stinger usually breaks off in the wound, and as it is barbed it can easily penetrate the skin but is difficult to remove once lodged into the victim. The stinger causes local trauma from the cut itself, pain and swelling from the venom, and possible later infection from bacteria. Occasionally severed arteries or death can result.
- Another very well-known venomous fish is the fang-tooth blenny. They have venom that contains the opioid-like enkephalin, phospholipase, and neuropeptide Y. Enkephalin and phospholipase both produce inflammatory responses and neuropeptide Y induces a severe drop in blood pressure to the effected area. Blennies inject their venom via hollow, mandibular fangs.

== Antivenom ==
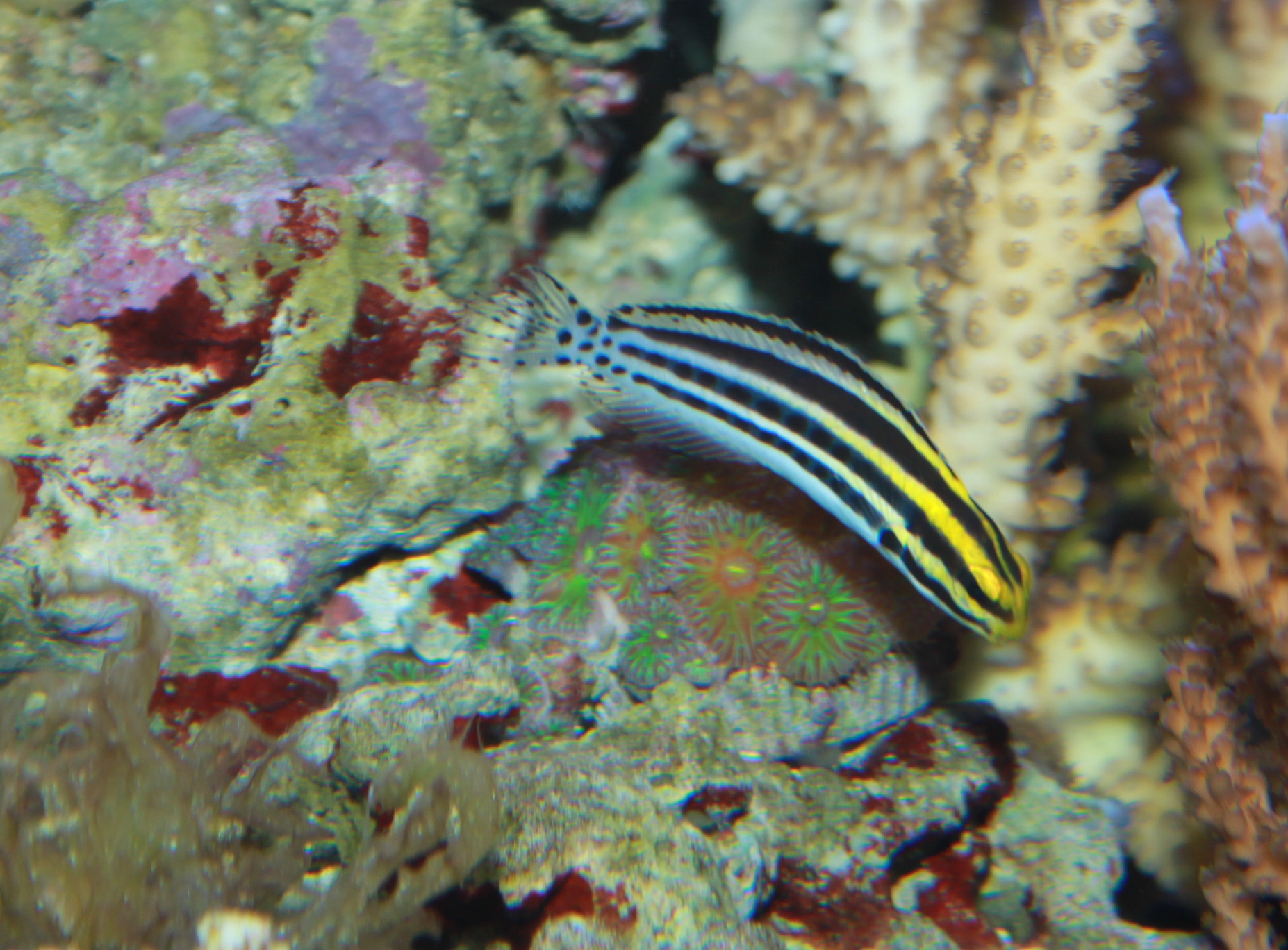
Striped poison fang blenny can deliver a quick and painful bite.

Venomous fish are very often involved in human injury, usually by accident, but few studies have been done to investigate the constituents of fish venom. Even fewer studies have been done to create antivenom.

The only commercially available antivenom is for the Indo-Pacific stonefish, Synanceja trachynis Stonefish Antivenom (SFAV).

== Biological and pharmacological importance of fish venoms ==
It has been found that the mucous and sting venom of Potamotrygon cf. henlei, a species of stingray that is found in Brazil, is toxic to mice that have nociceptive, edematogenic, and proteolysis activities. Two peptides were isolated from the stingray venom, orpotrin, which causes vasoconstriction, and porflan, which causes inflammation. Knowing how these peptides are structured could lead to the development of a neutralization technique that could effectively act as an antivenom.

Of all the piscine venoms studied, they all produce profound cardiovascular alterations, both in vivo and in vitro. These changes stimulate the release of nitric oxide from the endothelial cells, smooth muscle contractions, and other effects of the atria. Piscine venoms also produce neuromuscular activity effects- depolarization of nerve and muscle cells. In addition, piscine venoms have strong cytolytic activity. In experimental models and in Western immunoblotting analysis, all tested piscine venoms showed structural similarity, which could lead to the advent of an overarching antivenom or other novel uses.

== See also ==
- Scorpionfish
- Toadfish
- Weever
- Catfish
- Blenny
- Carangoid
- Scat fish
- Stargazer
- Rabbitfish
- Surgeonfish
- Gurnard perch
- Lionfish
- Stonefish
- Waspfish
- Venomous snake
- Snake venom
- Venomous mammal
- List of venomous animals
