= Envenomation =

Process of venom injection

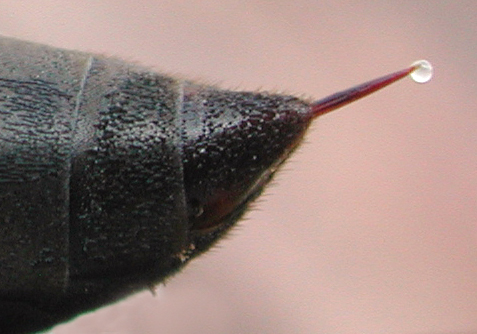
- A droplet of venom on the stinger of a wasp
- Specialty: Toxicology

Envenomation is the process by which venom is injected by the bite or sting of a venomous animal.

Many kinds of animals, including mammals (e.g., the northern short-tailed shrew, Blarina brevicauda), reptiles (e.g., many snakes), spiders, insects (e.g., wasps) and other arthropods, and fish (e.g., stone fish) employ venom for hunting and for self-defense.

In particular, snakebite is considered to be a neglected tropical disease causing over 100,000 deaths and maiming over 400,000 people per year.

== Mechanisms ==
Some venoms are applied externally, especially to sensitive tissues such as the eyes, but most venoms are administered by piercing the skin of the victim. Venom in the saliva of the Gila monster and some other reptiles enters prey through bites of grooved teeth. More commonly animals have specialized organs such as hollow teeth (fangs) and tubular stingers that penetrate the prey's skin, whereupon muscles attached to the attacker's venom reservoir squirt venom deep within the victim's body tissue. For example, the fangs of venomous snakes are connected to a venom gland by means of a duct. Venomous bites or stings can be fatal, sometimes even to larger animals such as humans.

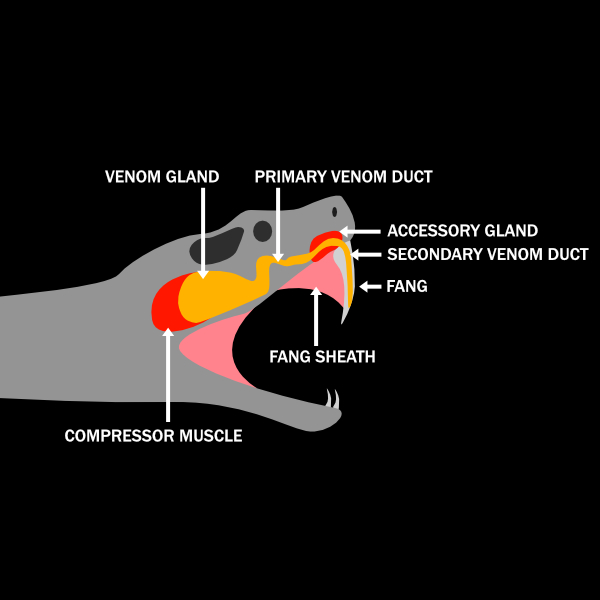
Diagram of a snake's venom penetration system

=== Snakes ===
Snakes administer venom to their target by piercing the target's skin with specialized teeth known as fangs. A snakebite involves four stages; strike launch, fang erection, fang penetration, and fang withdrawal. Snakes have a venom gland feeding into a duct and then fangs. The fangs have hollow tubes with grooved sides. During snake bites, the fangs penetrate the skin of the target and the fang sheath, a soft tissue organ surrounding the fangs, is retracted. The fang sheath retraction initiates an increase in internal pressure that drives venom flow to the fangs. Large snakes administer more venom than smaller snakes. Snake envenomation events are usually classified as either predatory or defensive. Defensive envenomation injects much larger quantities of venom into the target, with 8.5 times greater flow rate and 10 times greater venom mass than predatory strikes. This is consistent with the need to quickly neutralize an attacker.

Predatory strikes are different from defensive strikes: the snake strikes and envenomates the target, and then quickly releases it, preventing the target from damaging the snake. Once released, the target animal may withdraw but soon dies. Venom has a scent easily recognized by the snake that delivered it, allowing it to locate the prey's body. While not all snake species in every situation release their prey after envenomation, venom generally assists in finding bitten prey. Venomous snakes have been shown to be aware of the relative size of prey: juvenile rattlesnakes were experimentally shown to have the ability to adapt the volume of venom they expelled based on prey size. Once experienced, the juvenile rattlesnakes consistently expelled more venom when attacking larger mice. This ability allows the snake to inject enough venom to kill the prey while conserving its venom supply.

== Diagnosis and treatment ==
Deaths from venomous animal contact

Each year there are around 2 million cases of snake envenomation of humans that cause up to 100,000 deaths worldwide. Diagnosing snake envenomation is a crucial step in determining which antivenom to administer. There are various anti-venom treatments, typically consisting of antibodies or antibody fragments which neutralize the venom. The bites of some snakes, such as pit vipers and coral snakes, require specific treatment. Anti-venom therapy is designed to treat the hemorrhaging and coagulation effects that venom has on humans.

== See also ==
- List of venomous animals
- Toxicology
