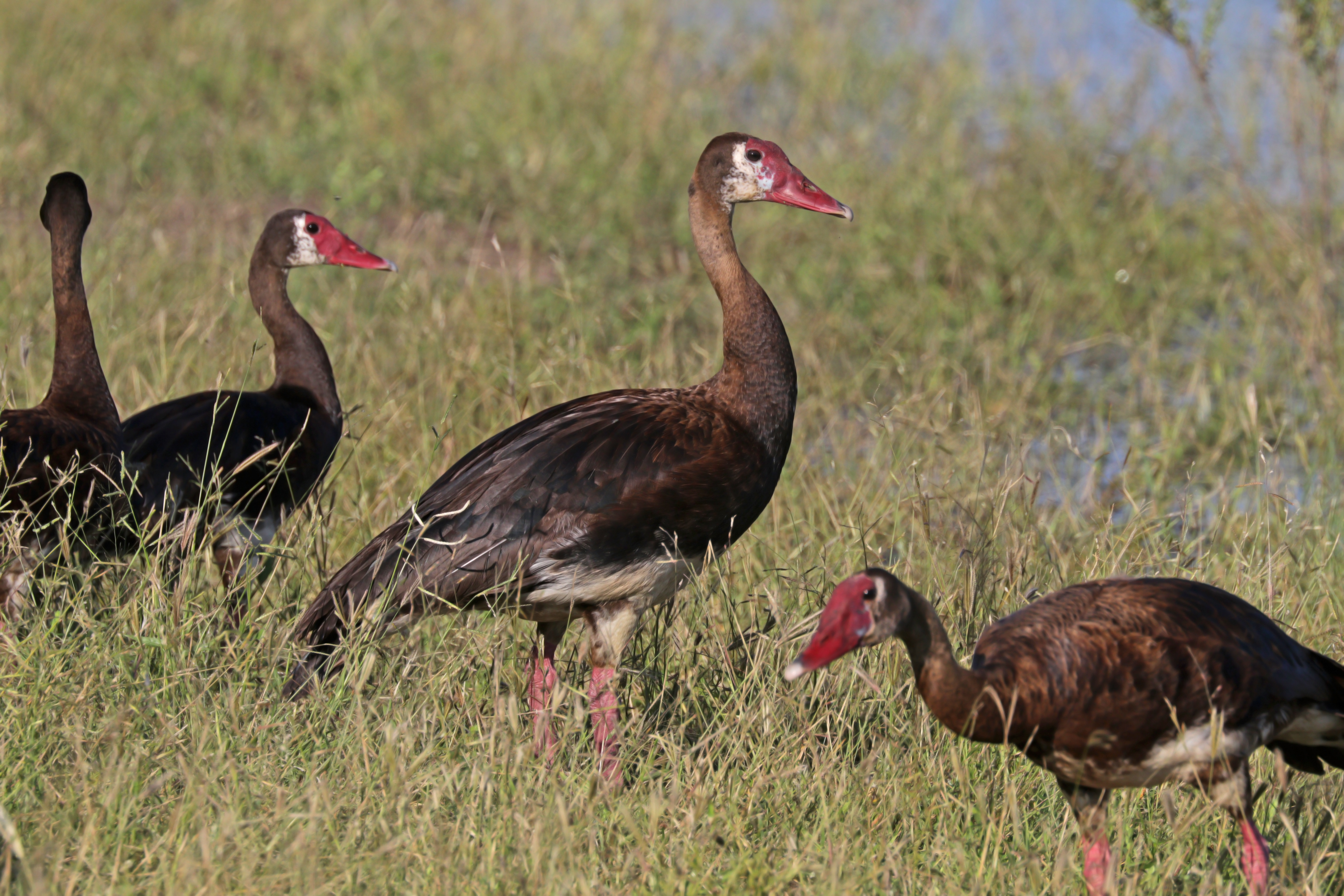
- Chobe National Park, Botswana

Conservation status
- Least Concern (IUCN 3.1)

Scientific classification
- Kingdom: Animalia
- Phylum: Chordata
- Class: Aves
- Order: Anseriformes
- Family: Anatidae
- Subfamily: Tadorninae
- Genus: Plectropterus; Stephens, 1824
- Species: P. gambensis

Binomial name
- Plectropterus gambensis (Linnaeus, 1766)

Subspecies
- P. g. gambensis (Linnaeus, 1766); P. g. niger (Sclater, 1877)
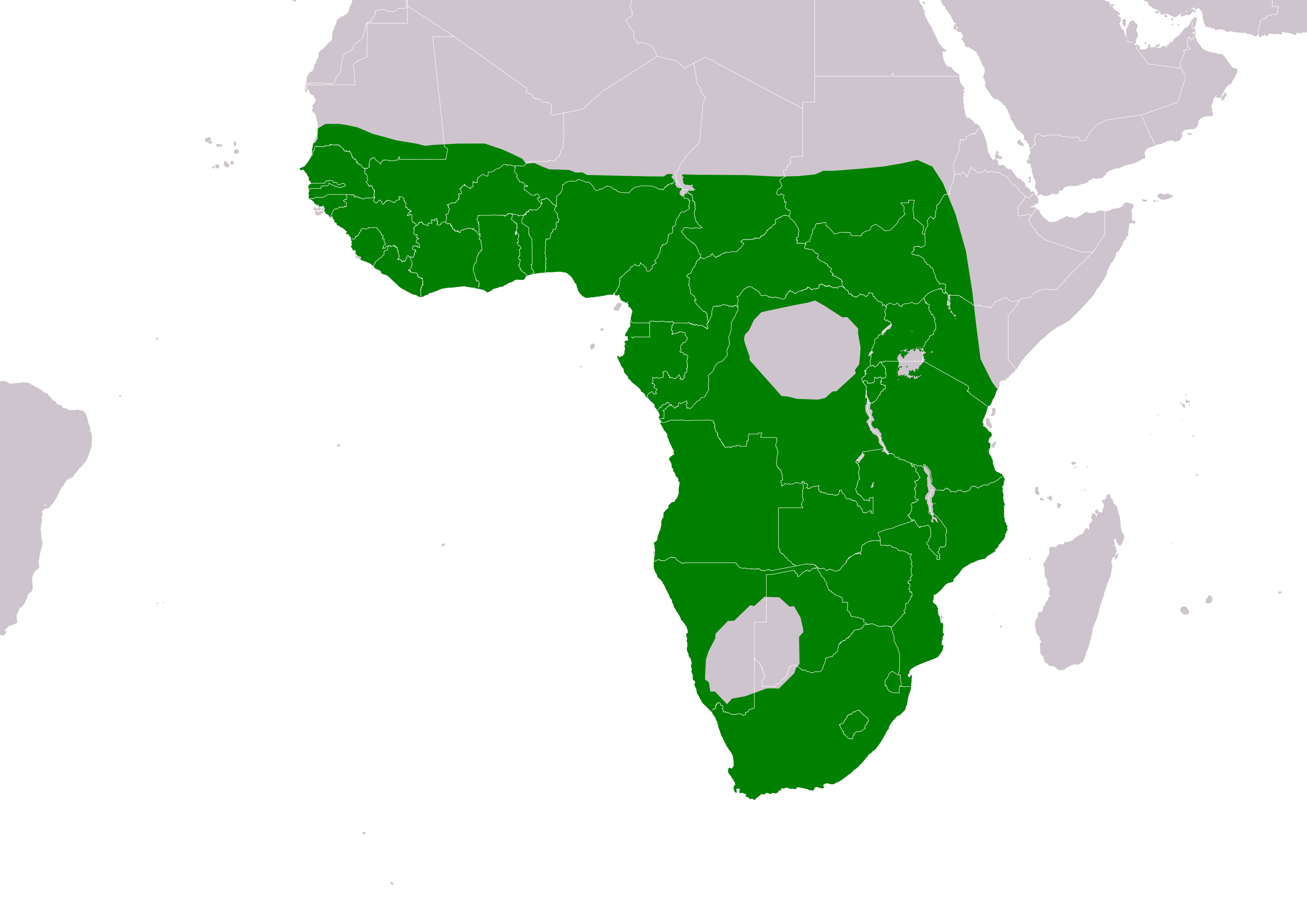
- Range of G. gambensis Resident

Synonyms
- Anas gambensis Linnaeus, 1766

= Spur-winged goose =

Species of bird

The spur-winged goose (Plectropterus gambensis) is a large, Sub-Saharan African waterbird in the family Anatidae, which includes geese and shelducks. However, P. gambensis developed unique environmental adaptations, which resulted in the evolution of several anatomical features that are not shared with other anatids; thus, the species has been classified one step further into its own subfamily, the Plectropterinae.

== Description ==
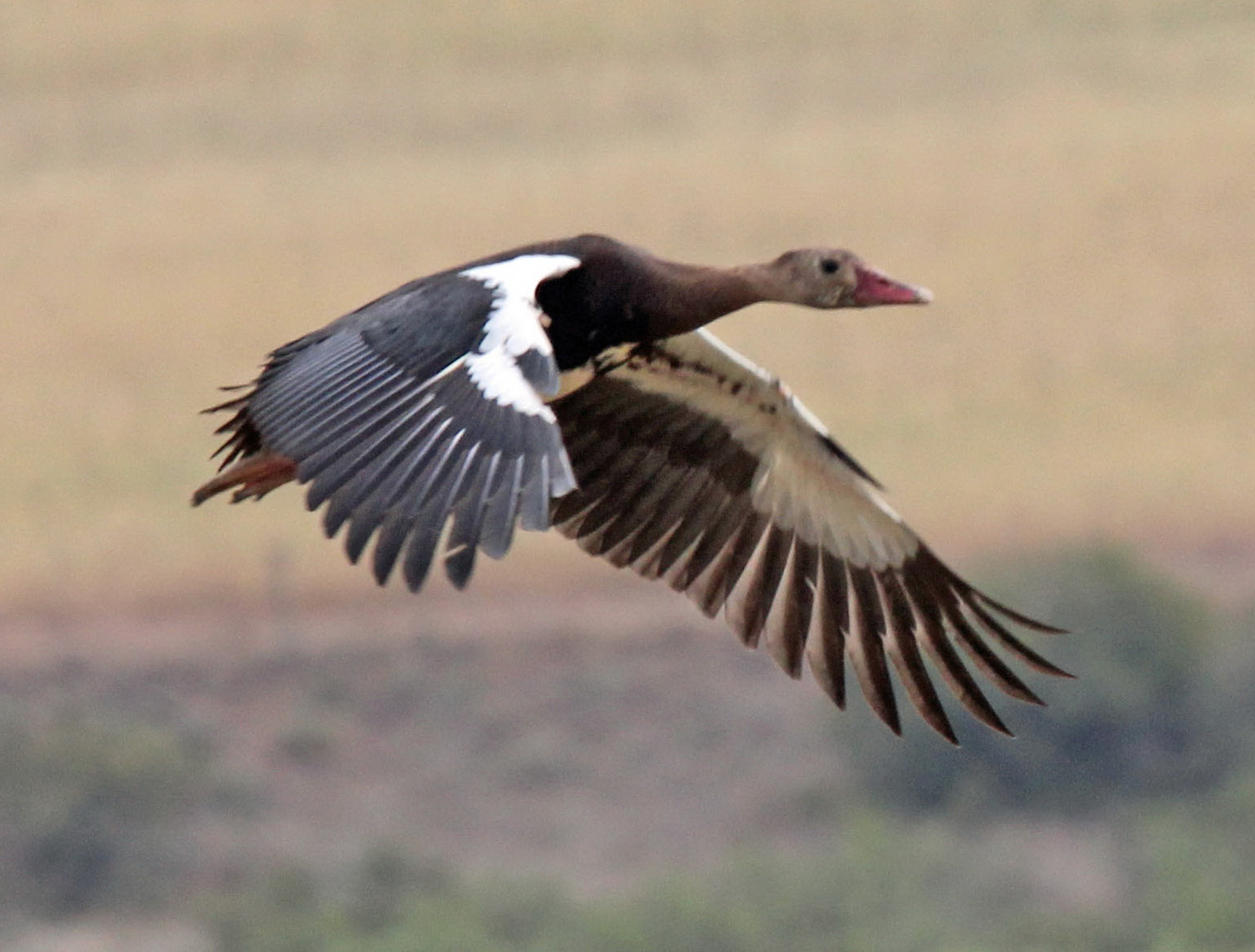
De Hoop Nature Reserve, South Africa

Adults are 75–115 cm (30–45 in) long, and weigh an average of 4–6.8 kg (8.8–15.0 lb) (rarely up to 10 kg (22 lb)), with ganders (males) being noticeably larger than the geese. The wingspan can range from 150 to 200 cm (59 to 79 in). One source claims the average weight of males is around 6 kg (13 lb) and the weight of females is around 4.7 kg (10 lb). However, 11 individuals that were banded in South Africa, were found to average only 3.87 kg (8.5 lb), with a range of 2.4 to 5.4 kg (5.3 to 11.9 lb). Another South African-based study found 58 males weighing an average of 5.52 kg (12.2 lb) and measuring 98.1 cm (38.6 in) in total length; meanwhile, 34 females averaged 3.35 kg (7.4 lb) in weight and 84.2 cm (33.1 in) in total length. Among standard measurements, the wing chord is 42.5 to 55 cm (16.7 to 21.7 in), the bill is 5.7 to 6.4 cm (2.2 to 2.5 in) and the tarsus is 5.7 to 12 cm (2.2 to 4.7 in). They are among the largest true African waterfowl (besides the wading Goliath heron) and are, on average, the world's largest "goose", although in average weight, their size is at least rivaled by the Cape Barren goose. Spur-winged geese appear to be more closely allied to shelducks than "true geese" such as those from the Branta and Anser genera. They are mainly black, with a white face and large white wing patches. The long legs are pinkish red in colour.

Image	Subspecies	Description	Distribution
	P. g. gambensis (Linnaeus, 1766)	The nominate race, has extensive white on the belly and flanks, but the smaller-bodied.	Gambia to Ethiopia, south to Angola and the River Zambezi.
	P. g. niger(Sclater, 1877)	Has only a small white belly patch. From a distance, P. g. niger can appear to be all black.	Occurs south of the Zambezi River in southern Africa from Namibia and Zimbabwe to the Cape Provinces.

The male differs from the female, not only in size, but also in having a larger red facial patch extending back from the red bill, and a knob at the base of the upper mandible. This is generally a quiet species. Typically, only males make a call, which consists of a soft bubbling cherwit when taking wing or alarmed. During breeding displays or in instances of alarm, both sexes may utter other inconspicuous calls.

== Toxicity ==
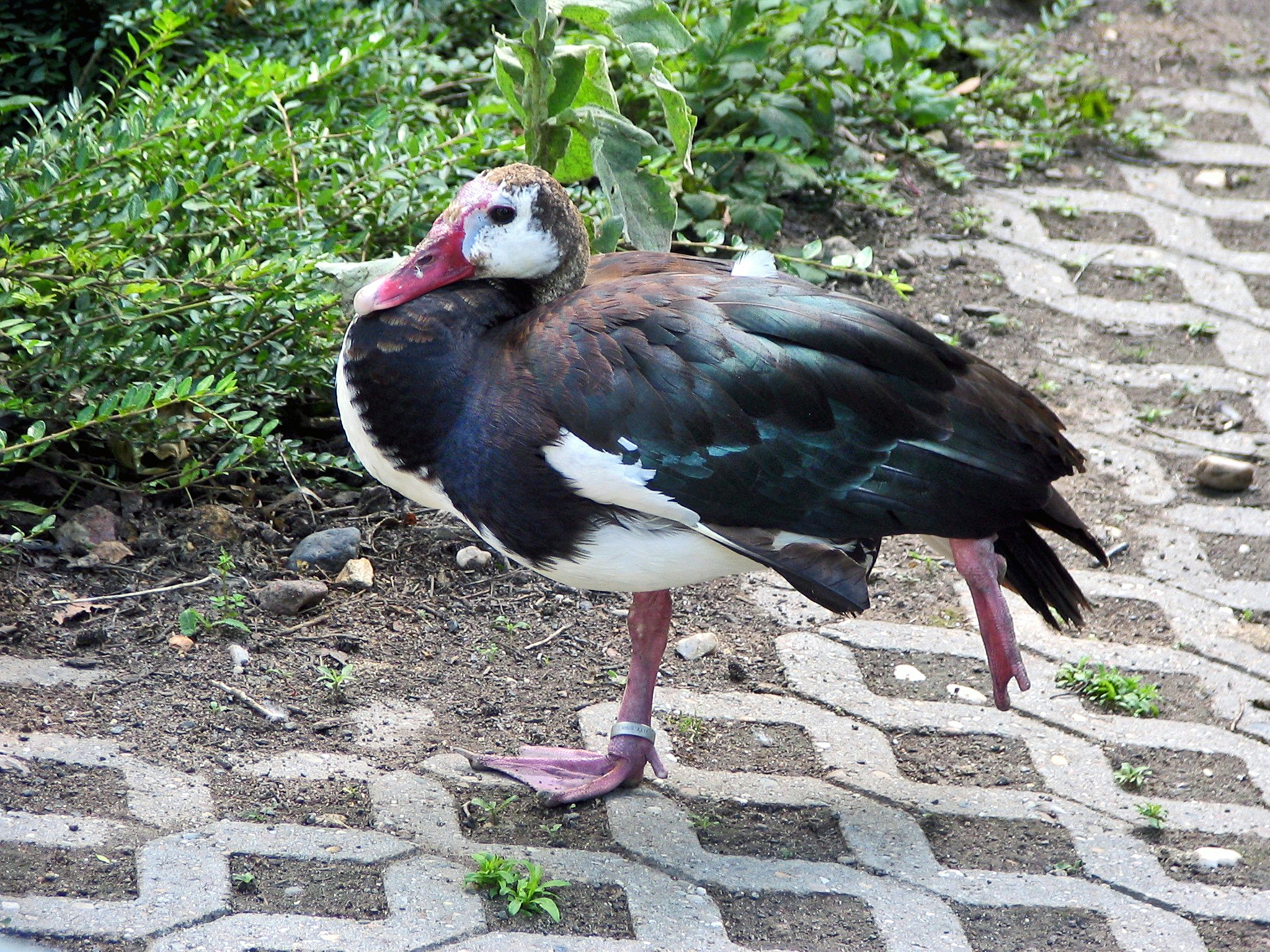
in a zoo in Germany

Some populations of the spur-winged goose are toxic. Populations that have a diet that includes significant quantities of blister beetles are poisonous. The poison, cantharidin, is held within the tissue of the bird resulting in poisoning of those that eat the cooked goose. A dose of 10 mg of cantharidin can kill a human.

== Habitat ==
This species often occurs in open grasslands with lakes, seasonal pools, rivers, swamps and river deltas. Large inland rivers and lakes are perhaps most commonly inhabited, with saline lakes and upland areas generally being avoided, although the species can occur to an elevation of 3,000 m (9,800 ft) in eastern Africa. It is also absent from arid zones.

== Ecology ==
The spur-winged goose is gregarious, generally meeting in small flocks that contain up to 50 birds. They occur around various African rivers, lakes and swamps. Varied sites may be used for post-breeding moulting, in which case large numbers of the geese may congregate. This common species feeds by grazing, but spends the middle part of the day resting by water. Its diet consists predominantly of plant matter such as the vegetative parts and seeds of grasses, sedges and aquatic plants, agricultural grains, fruit (e.g. figs) and tuberous crops, although it may occasionally supplement its diet with small fish or insects. Dispersal may occur in pursuit of feeding opportunities outside of the breeding season.

The breeding season for spur-winged geese is variable across the range. In the north, breeding generally occurs from August to December, in eastern Africa from January to June and in southern Africa from August to May. This species is highly aggressive to other waterfowl (including conspecifics) during the breeding season. At this time of the year, the geese may violently put the spur on the bend of the wings to use in conflicts with other birds. Adult male geese are especially prone to attacking other adult males. The large nest is usually concealed in vegetation near water, but tree holes, cavities in rocks, old hamerkop, African fish eagle or social weaver nests and even the top of a termite mound and an aardvark burrow have been used as nests. When choosing a tree-nest site, they will generally select a nest located close to the ground at between 20 and 100 cm (7.9 and 39.4 in) high in trees 3 to 4 m (9.8 to 13.1 ft) high. Generally, they prefer quiet, undisturbed stretches of riverbank and wetlands for nest sites.

== Status ==
The spur-winged goose is a common bird of African wetlands. Perhaps the main threat to the species is development and destruction of wetland habitats and unregulated hunting. A counting survey of the population in western Africa wetlands from Senegal to Chad in early 1977 produced a count of 10,000 geese, mostly being found in the Niger basin. This bird is one of the species to which the Agreement on the Conservation of African-Eurasian Migratory Waterbirds (AEWA) applies.
