= Coturnism =

Muscle tenderness after eating quail

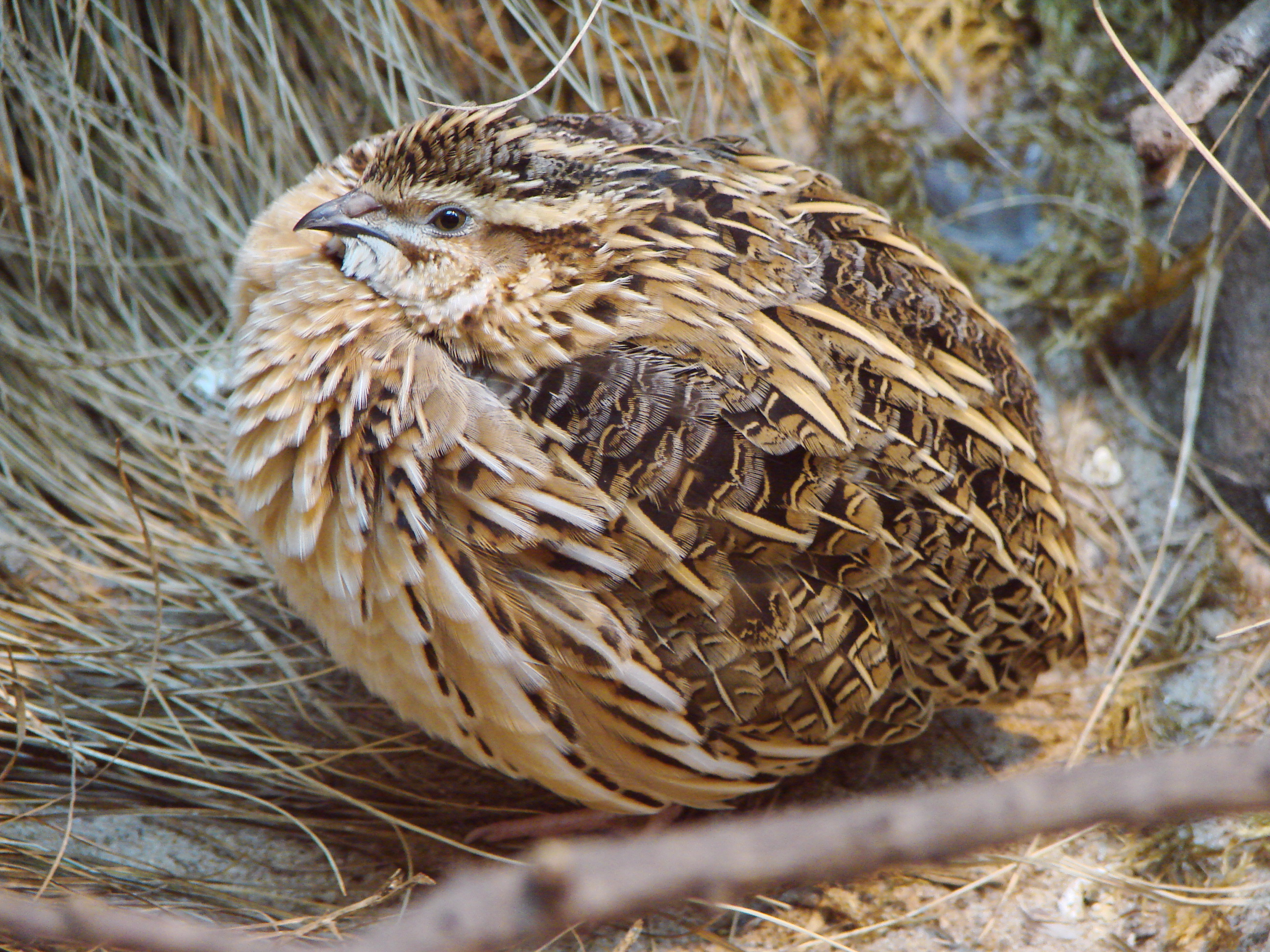
- Coturnix coturnix
- Specialty: Toxicology

Coturnism is an illness featuring muscle tenderness and rhabdomyolysis (muscle cell breakdown) after consuming quail (usually common quail, Coturnix coturnix, from which the name derives) that have fed on poisonous plants.

== Causes ==
From case histories it is known that the toxin is stable, as four-month-old pickled quail have been poisonous. Humans vary in their susceptibility; only one in four people who consumed quail soup containing the toxin fell ill. It is apparently fat-soluble, as potatoes fried in quail fat are also poisonous.

Coniine from hemlock consumed by quail has been suggested as the cause of coturnism, though quail resist eating hemlock. Hellebore has also been suggested as the source of the toxin. It has also been asserted that this evidence points to the seeds of the annual woundwort (Stachys annua) being the causal agent. It has been suggested that Galeopsis ladanum seeds are not responsible.

== Epidemiology ==
Migration routes and season may affect quail risk. Quail are never poisonous outside the migration season nor are the vast majority poisonous while migrating. European common quail migrate along three different flyways, each with different poisoning characteristics, at least in 20th-century records. The western flyway across Algeria to France is associated with poisonings only on the spring migration and not on the autumn return. The eastern flyway, which funnels down the Nile Valley, is the reverse. Poisonings were only reported in the autumn migration before the quail had crossed the Mediterranean. The central flyway across Italy had no associated poisonings.

== History ==
The condition was certainly known by the 4th century BC to the ancient Greek (and subsequently Roman) naturalists, physicians, and theologians. The Bible (Numbers 11:31-34) mentions an incident where the Israelites became ill after having consumed large amounts of quail in Sinai. Philo gives a more detailed version of the same Biblical story (The Special Laws: 4: 120–131). Early writers used quail as the standard example of an animal that could eat something poisonous to man without ill effects for themselves. Aristotle (On Plants 820:6-7), Philo (Geoponics: 14: 24), Lucretius (On the Nature of Things: 4: 639–640), Galen (De Temperamentis: 3:4) and Sextus Empiricus (Outlines of Pyrrhonism: 1: 57) all make this point.

Central to these ancient accounts is the idea that quail became toxic to humans after consuming seeds from hellebore or henbane (Hyoscyamus niger). However Sextus Empiricus suggested that quail ate hemlock (Conium maculatum), an idea revived in the 20th century. Confirmation that the ancients understood the problem comes from a 10th-century text, Geoponica, based on ancient sources. This states, "Quails may graze hellebore putting those who afterwards eat them at risk of convulsions and vertigo....".
