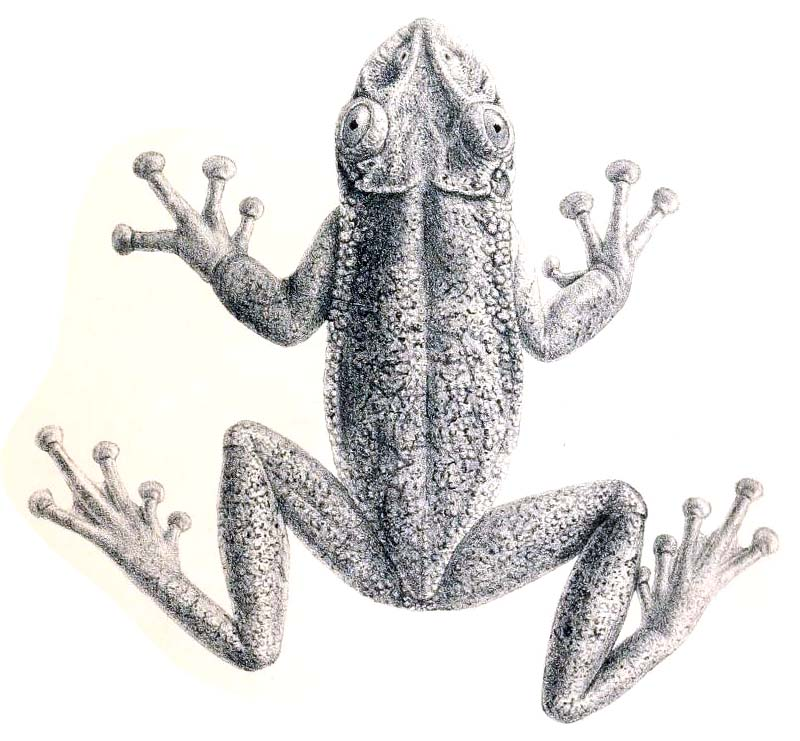
- Drawing from 1896 species description

Conservation status
- Least Concern (IUCN 3.1)

Scientific classification
- Kingdom: Animalia
- Phylum: Chordata
- Class: Amphibia
- Order: Anura
- Family: Hylidae
- Genus: Corythomantis
- Species: C. greeningi

Binomial name
- Corythomantis greeningi Boulenger, 1896

Synonyms
- List: Corythomantis schubarti Miranda-Ribeiro, 1937; Corythomantis schubarthae Lutz, 1968

= Corythomantis greeningi =

Species of amphibian

Corythomantis greeningi, occasionally called Greening's frog, is a venomous frog species in the family Hylidae endemic to eastern Brazil, where it lives in the Caatinga habitat. It is usually situated on vegetation, including in bromeliads, and on rock outcrops. Breeding occurs in temporary streams. Although suffering from habitat loss, it is not considered threatened by the IUCN. The specific name greeningi was in honour of Linnaeus Greening (1855–1927), an English businessman and naturalist known for his work on arachnids, reptiles and amphibians.

== Description ==
Female Corythomantis greeningi grow to a length of about 87 mm (3.4 in) while males are slightly smaller at 71 mm (2.8 in). The head is narrow, with bony crests behind the eyes and a long flat snout, armed with small spines. The body is slender, the skin being covered with warts. The legs are also slender and the fingers and toes have well-developed adhesive discs at the tip. The general color is light brown or gray, liberally blotched with red or brown patches; females are generally darker in color than males.

== Distribution and habitat ==
Corythomantis greeningi is endemic to northeastern Brazil. Its range extends as far south as the northern part of Minas Gerais state. It inhabits a caatinga ecoregion, a semi-desert vegetation of shrublands and thorn forest. This experiences a short wet season, lasting about three months, and a long hot dry season.

== Ecology ==
With a need to keep its skin moist and as a protection against predators, C. greeningi conceals itself in a tree hollow, a rock crevice, a bromeliad or other suitable location. In the laboratory, a female frog used a test tube for a retreat, sealing off the aperture with its head. In their natural habitat, when the rainy season starts and the creeks and channels run with water, male frogs establish territories near the watercourses and call to attract females. Several hundred eggs are laid by the female, attached to a rock in the watercourse.

This frog has evolved certain adaptations to enable it to live in a semi-arid environment. The head is roughened and flat, and the skin of the head is fused to the skull forming a casque; these features are often associated with phragmotic behaviour, in which an animal defends itself in a burrow by using its own body as a barrier. It has adapted its life cycle and method of reproduction to suit its environment. It also has a tough, impermeable skin which helps limit water loss, and a low basal metabolic rate which limits evaporation through its lungs. Unlike poison dart frogs which merely secrete poison from their skin, this species is equipped with skull spines capable of injecting venom into other animals, or human hands, via headbutting, a tactic it shares with Nyctimantis brunoi.

The skin secretions contain a number of low-molecular mass steroids and alkaloids. In the laboratory, these produce a powerful nociceptive (painful) effect and cause oedema in mice cells. The secretions also inhibit cell growth in mouse fibroblasts and melanoma cells. In the wild, these provide a useful arsenal of chemical defences against predation.

== Status ==
This frog has a wide range and is a common species with a large total population. The main threats it faces include habitat loss from livestock grazing and crop cultivation, and the occurrence of wildfires. The International Union for Conservation of Nature has rated its conservation status as being of "least concern", because any decrease in population size is likely to be at too slow a rate to justify classifying it in a more threatened category.
