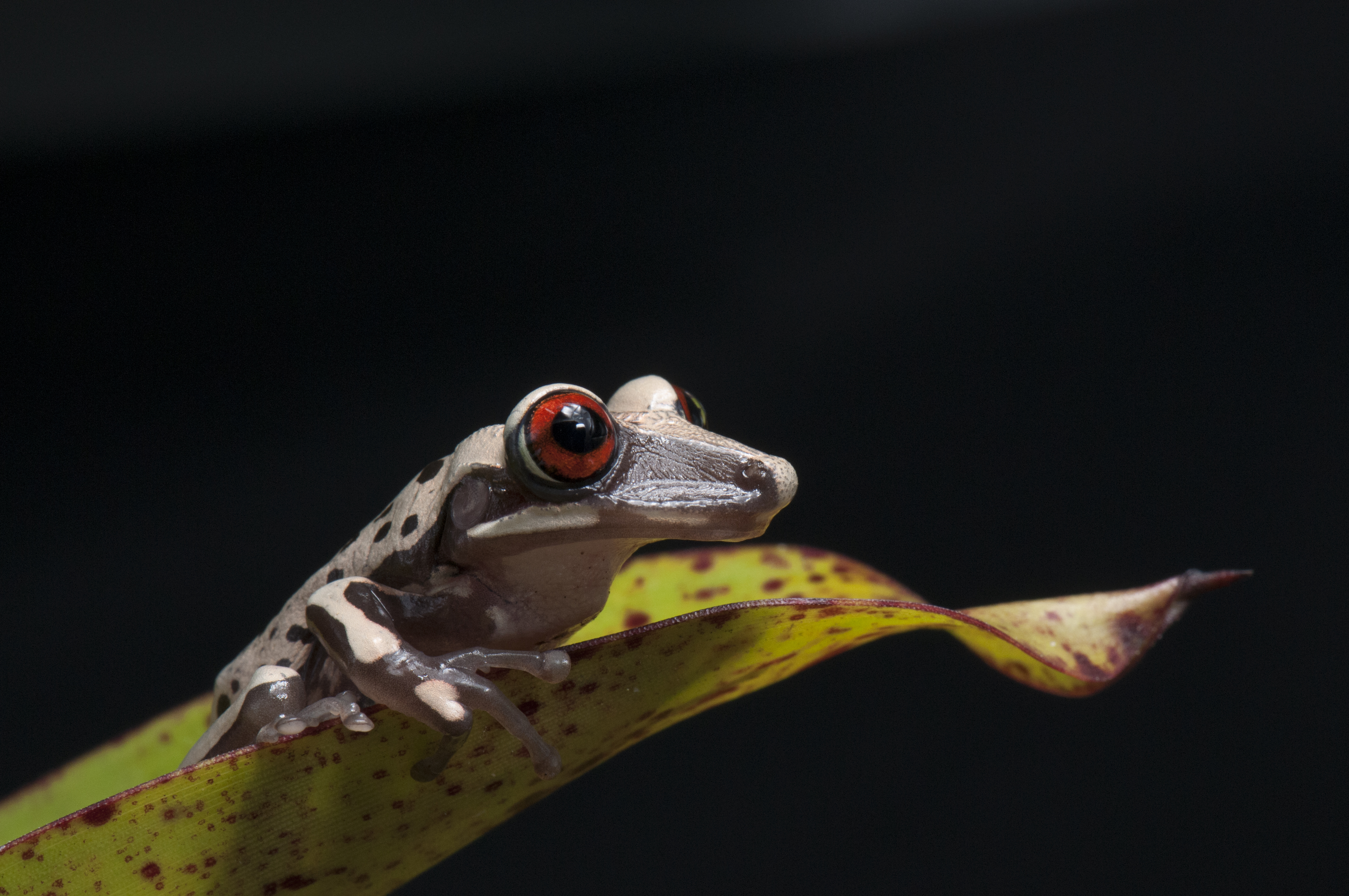

Conservation status
- Least Concern (IUCN 3.1)

Scientific classification
- Kingdom: Animalia
- Phylum: Chordata
- Class: Amphibia
- Order: Anura
- Family: Hylidae
- Genus: Nyctimantis
- Species: N. brunoi

Binomial name
- Nyctimantis brunoi (Miranda-Ribeiro, 1920)

Synonyms
- List: Aparasphenodon brunoi Miranda-Ribeiro, 1920; Corythomantis apicalis Miranda-Ribeiro, 1920; Corythomantis adspersa Lutz, 1925; Aparasphenodon apicalis Miranda-Ribeiro, 1926; Corythomantis brunoi Mertens, 1926; Aparasphenodon brunoi Carvalho, 1941; Corthomantis (Aparasphenodon) brunoi Lutz, 1954; Aparasphenodon adspersus Goin, 1961; Aparasphenodon brunoi Miranda-Ribeiro, 1920

= Bruno's casque-headed frog =

Species of amphibian

Bruno's casque-headed frog (Nyctimantis brunoi) is a species of frog in the family Hylidae. Endemic to Brazil, its natural habitats are subtropical or tropical moist lowland forests, subtropical or tropical moist shrubland, and intermittent freshwater marshes. It is threatened by habitat loss. The specific name brunoi was in honour of Dr Bruno Lobo, Professor and Director of the National Museum of Brazil (1915-1923).

== Description ==
This species is a relative large frog; males have a snout–to–vent length of 4.9 to 6.2 cm (1.9 to 2.4 in) while females measure 5.6 to 8.1 cm (2.2 to 3.2 in). The head is broad and flattened with a long pointed snout. The eyes are prominent and forward-facing. It has an array of sharp, pointed projections on the head, and the skin on the head is fused to the skull. The legs are long and slender and the digits have adhesive discs at the tips. The dorsal surface is pale brown or gray, with irregular dark markings.

== Distribution and habitat ==
Bruno's casque-headed frog is endemic to the coastal region of southeastern Brazil, east of the Brazilian Highlands. Its range extends southwards from the state of Bahia to the northern part of the state of São Paulo. It is found in forests and forest edges, hiding by day in water-filled hollows in trees or bamboos, and in the water-filled rosettes of bromeliads. It chooses to hide in a crevice that is exactly the correct size, and uses its head to seal the entrance. Its maximum altitude is about 500 m (1,600 ft).

Unlike poison dart frogs which merely secrete poison from their skin, this species is equipped with skull spines capable of injecting venom into other animals or human hands via headbutting, a tactic it shares with Corythomantis greeningi. The venom of A. brunoi is estimated to be 25 times as toxic as that of local fer-de-lance pit vipers. It has an LD_{50} of 0.16 mg/kg (I.P) and 1.6 mg/kg (S.C).
