= Fang =

Pointed specialized tooth

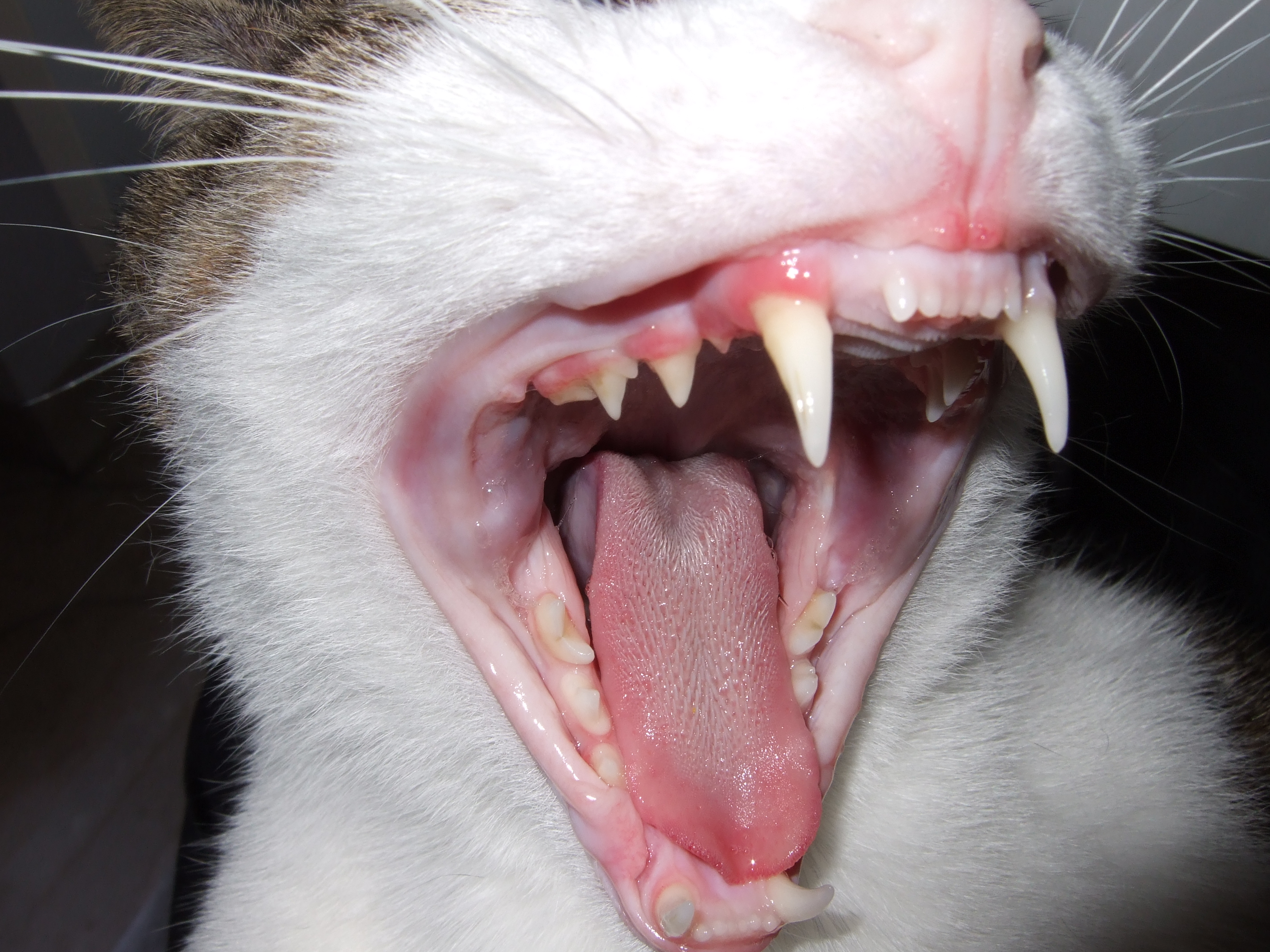
The four canines, or fangs, of a domestic cat. (The largest two teeth of the top and bottom rows of teeth.)

A fang is a long, pointed tooth. In mammals, a fang is a modified maxillary tooth, used for biting and tearing flesh. In snakes, it is a specialized tooth that is associated with a venom gland (see snake venom). Spiders also have external fangs, which are part of the chelicerae.

Fangs are most common in carnivores or omnivores, but some herbivores, such as fruit bats, have them as well. They are generally used to hold or swiftly kill prey, such as in large cats. Omnivorous animals, such as bears, use their fangs when hunting fish or other prey, but they are not needed for consuming fruit. Some apes also have fangs, which they use for threats and fighting. However, the relatively short canines of humans are not considered to be fangs.

== Fangs in religion, mythology and legend ==
Certain mythological and legendary creatures such as dragons, gargoyles, demons and yakshas are commonly depicted with prominent fangs. The fangs of vampires are one of their defining characteristics.

The iconographic representation of some Hindu deities include fangs, to symbolize the ability to hunt and kill. Two examples are fierce warrior goddess Chamunda and god of death Yama in some iconographic representations. Fangs are also common among guardian figures such as Verupaksha in Buddhism art in China and East Asia, as well as Rangda in Balinese Hinduism.

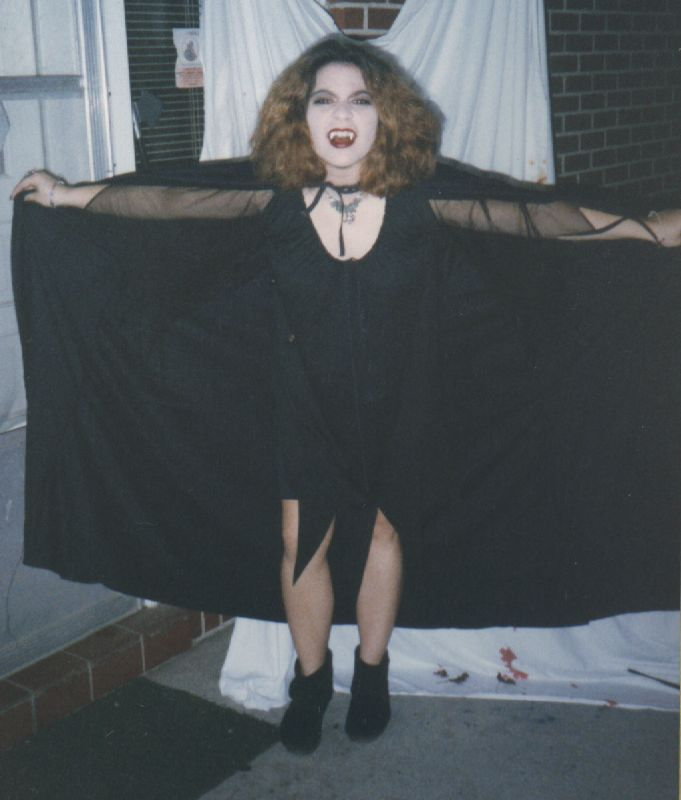
Halloween costume with vampire fangs

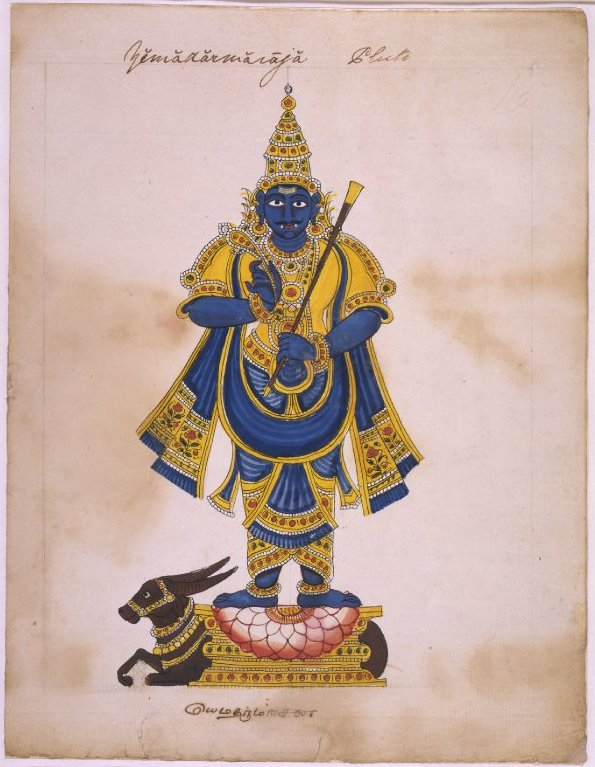
Hindu god of death Yama with fangs

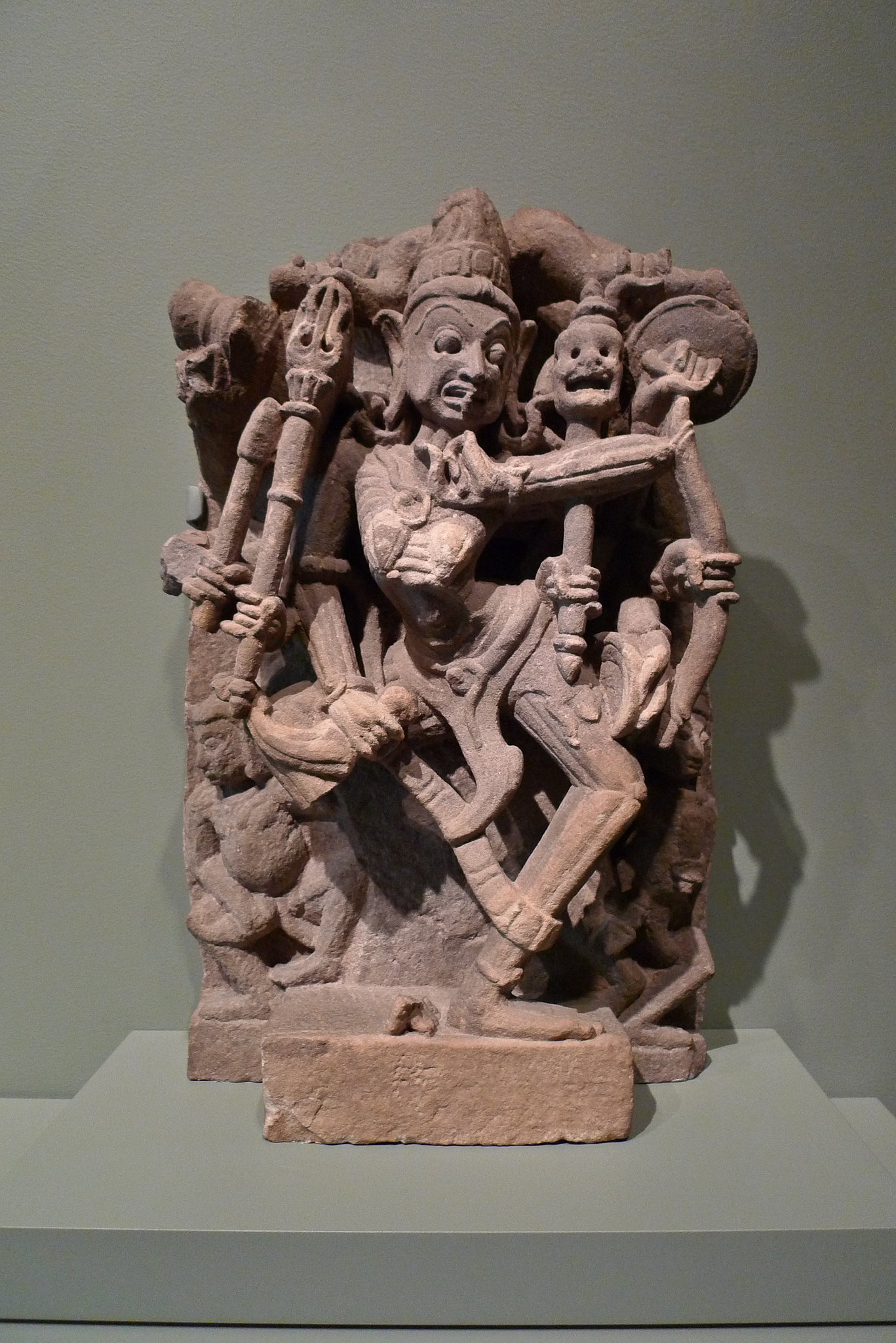
Hindu warrior goddess Chamunda.

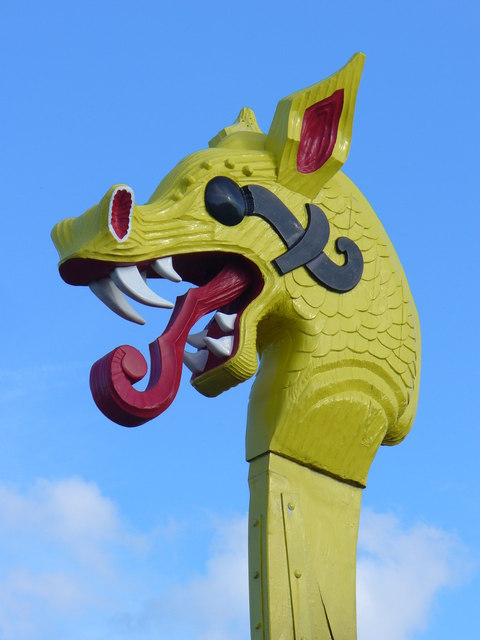
Dragon head on the replica ship, "Hugin"

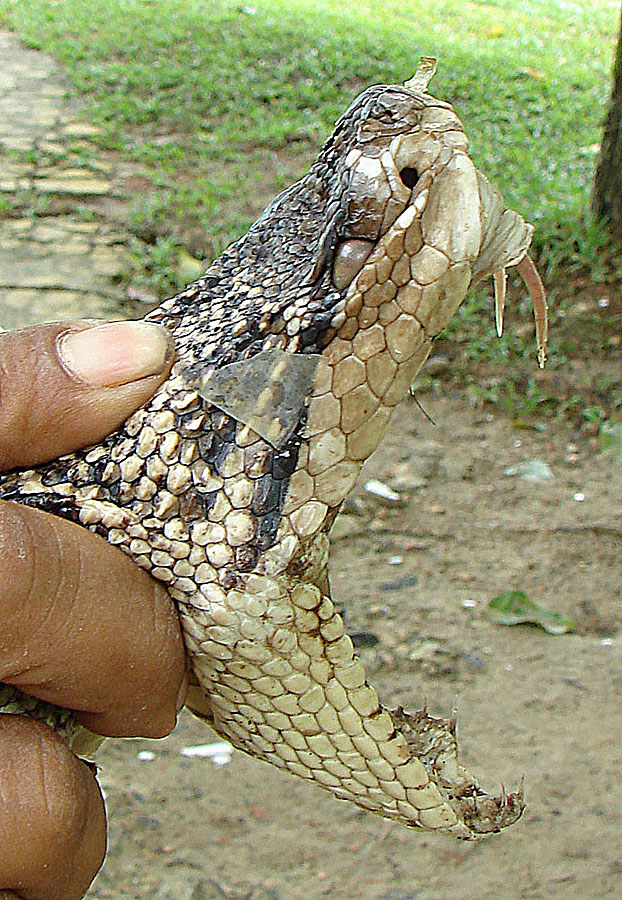
Snake fangs

== See also ==
- Canine tooth
- Tusk
