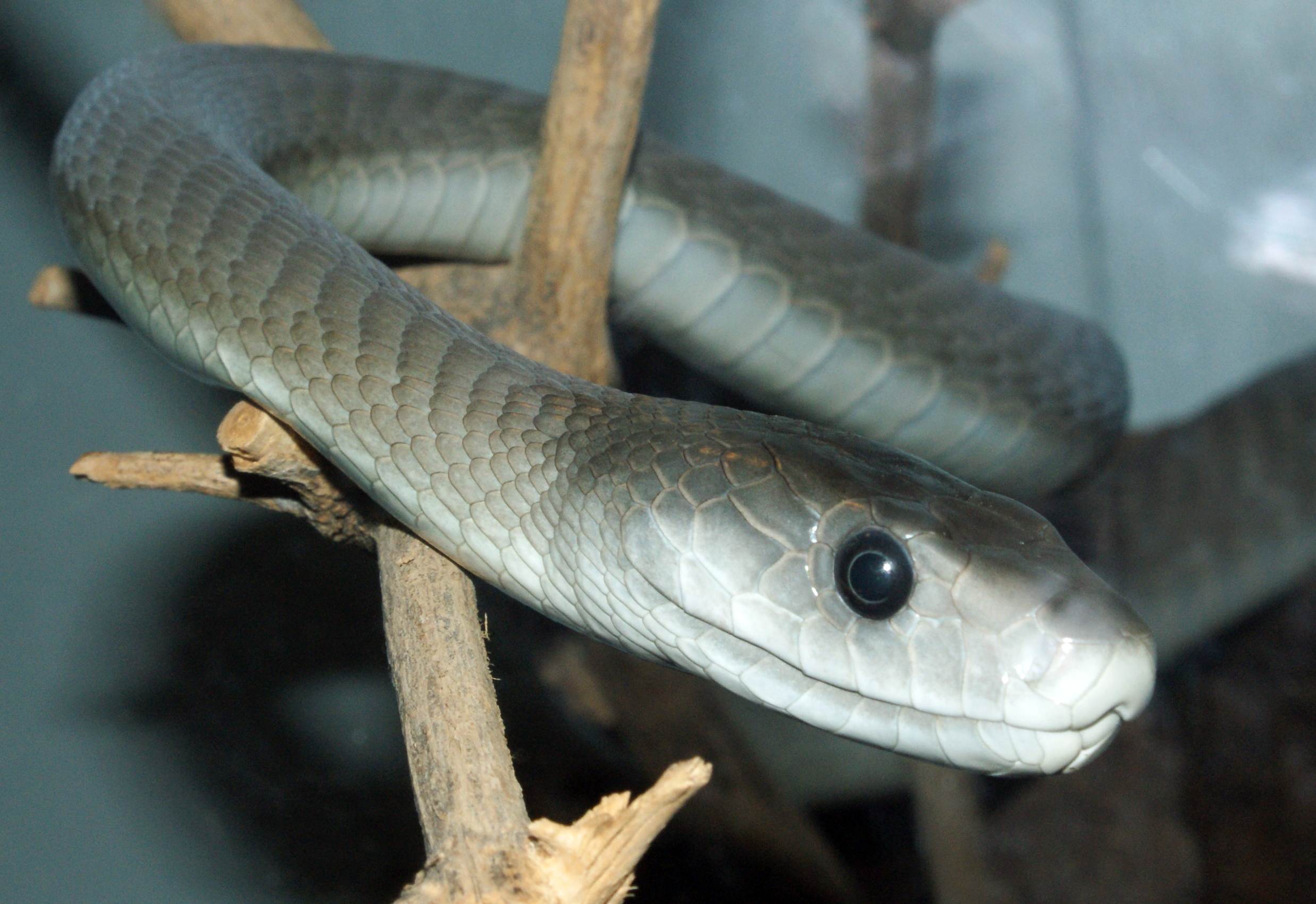

Conservation status
- Least Concern (IUCN 3.1)

Scientific classification
- Kingdom: Animalia
- Phylum: Chordata
- Class: Reptilia
- Order: Squamata
- Suborder: Serpentes
- Family: Elapidae
- Genus: Dendroaspis
- Species: D. polylepis

Binomial name
- Dendroaspis polylepis Günther, 1864
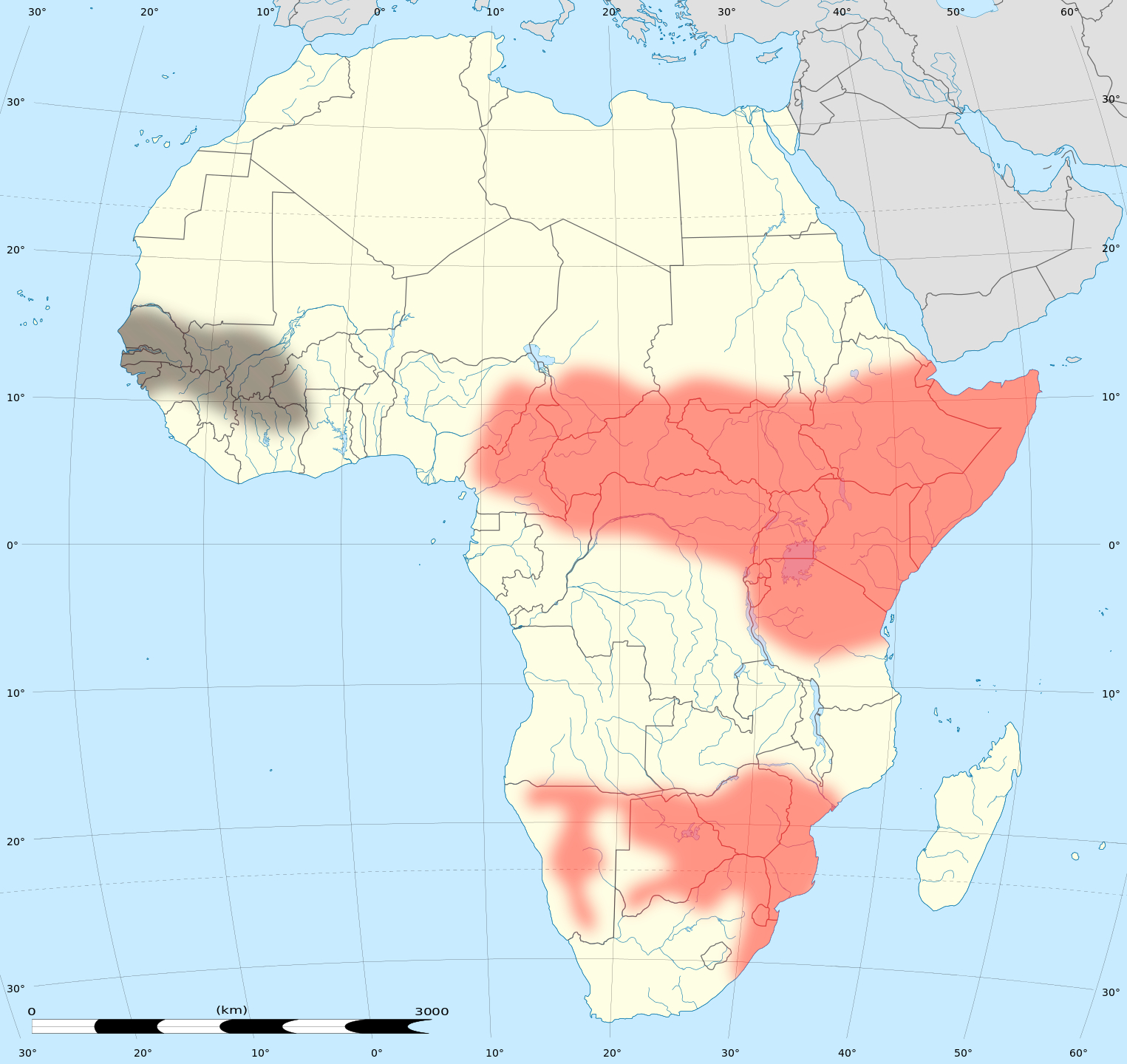
- Distribution range of black mamba in red (grey areas are inconclusive)

Synonyms
- List: Dendroaspis polylepis polylepis (Günther, 1864); Dendraspis polylepis (Günther, 1864); Dendraspis angusticeps (Boulenger, 1896); Dendraspis antinorii (Peters, 1873); Dendroaspis polylepis antinorii (Peters, 1873)

= Black mamba =

Species of venomous snake

The black mamba (Dendroaspis polylepis) is a species of highly venomous snake belonging to the family Elapidae. It is native to parts of sub-Saharan Africa. First formally described by Albert Günther in 1864, it is the second-longest venomous snake after the king cobra; mature specimens generally exceed 2 m (6 ft 7 in) and commonly grow to 3 m (9.8 ft). Specimens of 4.3 to 4.5 m (14 to 15 ft) have been reported. It varies in colour from grey to dark brown. Juvenile black mambas tend to be more pale in colour than adults, and darken with age. Despite the common name, the black mamba is not black; the colour name describes rather the inside of its mouth, which it displays when feeling threatened.

The species is both terrestrial (ground-living) and arboreal (tree-living); it inhabits savannah, woodland, rocky slopes and in some regions, dense forest. It is diurnal and is known to prey on birds and small mammals. Over suitable surfaces, it can move at speeds up to 16 km/h (10 mph) for short distances. Adult black mambas have few natural predators.

In a threat display, the black mamba usually opens its inky-black mouth, spreads its narrow neck-flap and sometimes hisses. It is capable of striking at considerable range and may deliver a series of bites in rapid succession. Its venom is primarily composed of neurotoxins that often induce symptoms within ten minutes, and is frequently fatal unless antivenom is administered. Despite its reputation as a formidable and highly aggressive species, the black mamba attacks humans only if it is threatened or cornered. It is rated as least concern on the International Union for Conservation of Nature (IUCN)'s Red List of Threatened Species.

== Taxonomy ==
The first formal description of the black mamba was made in 1864 by German-born British zoologist Albert Günther. A single specimen was one of many species of snake collected by John Kirk, a naturalist who accompanied David Livingstone on the 1858–1864 Second Zambesi expedition. This specimen is the holotype and is housed in the Natural History Museum, London.

In 1873, German naturalist Wilhelm Peters described Dendraspis antinorii from a specimen in the museum of Genoa that had been collected by Italian explorer Orazio Antinori in what is now northern Eritrea. This was subsequently regarded as a subspecies and is no longer held to be distinct. In 1896, Belgian-British zoologist George Albert Boulenger combined the species Dendroaspis polylepis as a whole with the eastern green mamba (Dendroaspis angusticeps), a lumping diagnosis that remained in force until 1946 when South African herpetologist Vivian FitzSimons again split them into separate species.

A 2016 genetic analysis showed the black and eastern green mambas are each other's closest relatives, and are more distantly related to Jameson's mamba (Dendroaspis jamesoni), as shown in the cladogram below.

- - - Ophiophagus hannah
  - - - - Dendroaspis j. jamesoni
        - Dendroaspis j. kaimosae
      - Dendroaspis viridis
    - - Dendroaspis angusticeps
      - Dendroaspis polylepis

=== Etymology ===
The generic name of the species is derived from the Ancient Greek words dendron (δένδρον), "tree", and aspis (ἀσπίς) "asp", and the specific epithet polylepis is derived from the Ancient Greek poly (πολύ) meaning "many" and lepis (λεπίς) meaning "scale". The term "mamba" is derived from the Zulu word "imamba". In Tanzania, a local Ngindo name is ndemalunyayo ("grass-cutter") because it supposedly clips grass.

== Description ==
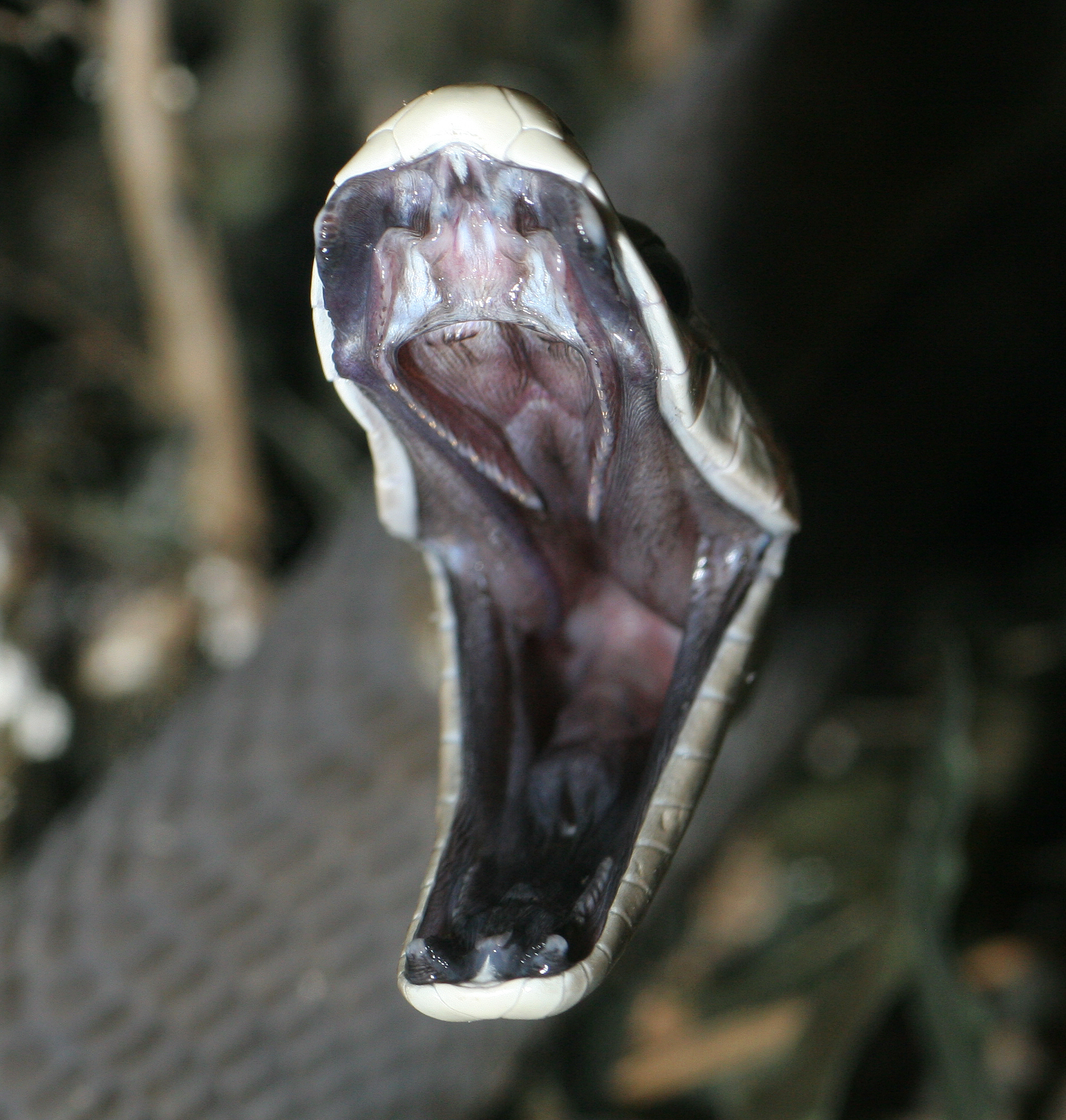
Showing the black mouth interior

The black mamba is a long, slender, cylindrical snake. It has a coffin-shaped head with a somewhat pronounced brow ridge and a medium-sized eyes. The adult snake's length typically ranges from 2 to 3 m (6 ft 7 in to 9 ft 10 in) but specimens have grown to lengths of 4.3 to 4.5 m (14 ft 1 in to 14 ft 9 in). It is the longest species of venomous snake in Africa and the second-longest venomous snake species overall, exceeded in length only by the king cobra. The black mamba is a proteroglyphous (front-fanged) snake, with fangs up to 6.5 mm (0.26 in) in length, located at the front of the maxilla. The tail of the species is long and thin, the caudal vertebrae making up 17–25% of its body length. The body mass of black mambas has been reported to be about 1.6 kg (3.5 lb), although a study of seven black mambas found an average weight of 1.03 kg (2.3 lb), ranging from 520 g (18 oz) for a specimen of 1.01 m (3 ft 4 in) total length to 2.4 kg (5.3 lb) for a specimen of 2.57 m (8 ft 5 in) total length.

Specimens vary considerably in colour, including olive, yellowish-brown, khaki and gunmetal but are rarely black. The scales of some individuals may have a purplish sheen. Individuals occasionally display dark mottling towards the posterior, which may appear in the form of diagonal crossbands. Black mambas have greyish-white underbellies. The common name is derived from the appearance of the inside of the mouth, dark bluish-grey to nearly black. Mamba eyes range between greyish-brown and shades of black; the pupil is surrounded by a silvery-white or yellow colour. Juvenile snakes are lighter in colour than adults; these are typically grey or olive green and darken as they age.

=== Scalation ===
The number and pattern of scales on a snake's body are a key element of identification to species level. The black mamba has between 23 and 25 rows of dorsal scales at midbody, 248 to 281 ventral scales, 109 to 132 divided subcaudal scales, and a divided anal scale. (Note: A divided scale is one split down the midline into two scales.) Its mouth is lined with 7–8 supralabial scales above, with the fourth and sometimes also the third one located under the eye, and 10-14 sublabial scales below. Its eyes have 3 or occasionally 4 preocular and 2–5 postocular scales.

== Distribution and habitat ==
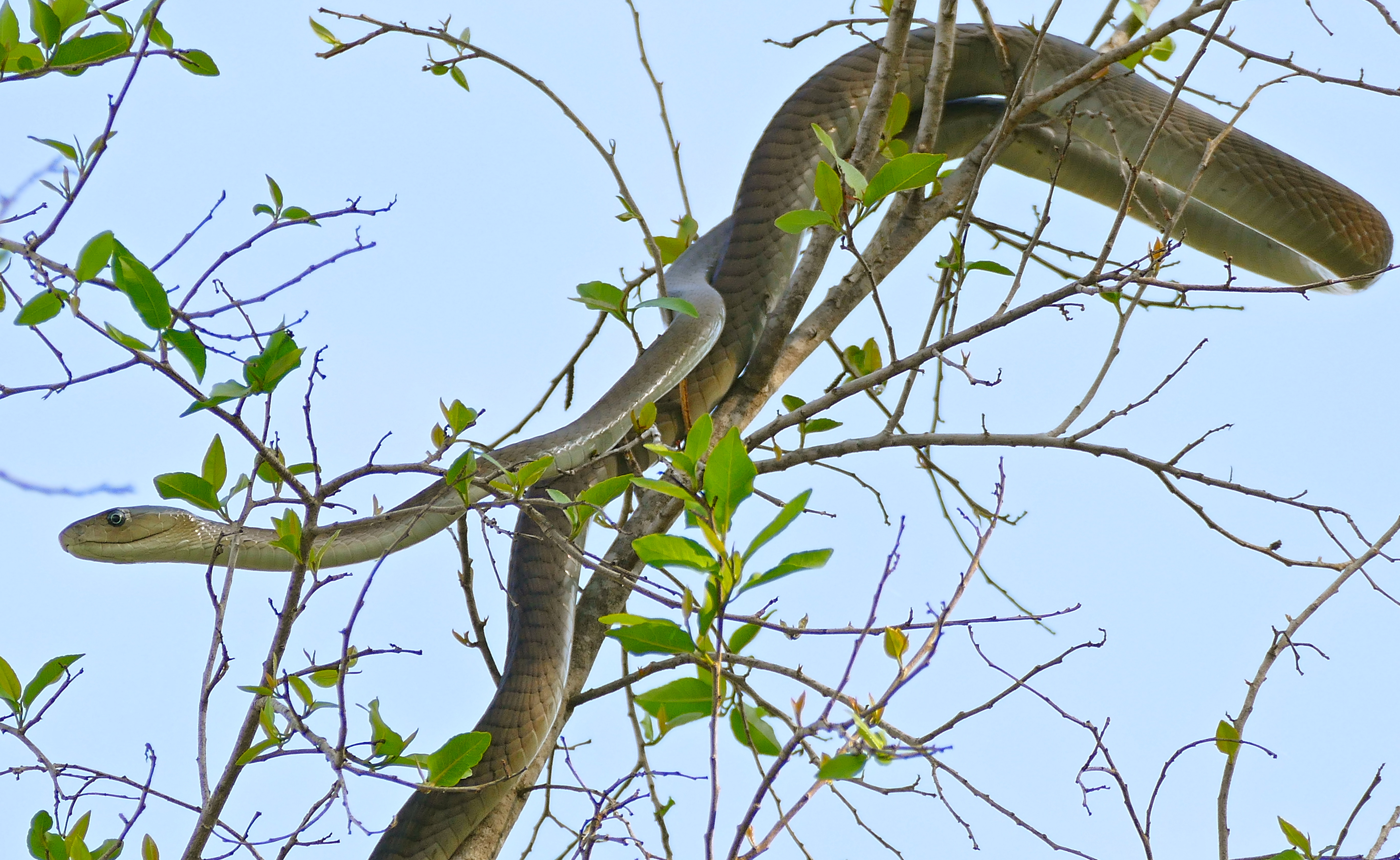
Juvenile in a tree, Kruger National Park, South Africa

The black mamba inhabits a wide range in sub-Saharan Africa; its range includes Burkina Faso, Cameroon, Central African Republic, Democratic Republic of the Congo, South Sudan, Ethiopia, Eritrea, Somalia, Kenya, Uganda, Tanzania, Burundi, Rwanda, Mozambique, Eswatini, Malawi, Zambia, Zimbabwe, Botswana, South Africa, Namibia, and Angola. The black mamba's distribution in parts of West Africa has been disputed. In 1954, the black mamba was recorded in the Dakar region of Senegal. This observation, and a subsequent observation that identified a second specimen in the region in 1956, has not been confirmed and thus the snake's distribution in this area is inconclusive.

The species prefers moderately dry environments such as light woodland and scrub, rocky outcrops and semi-arid savanna. It also inhabits moist savanna and lowland forests. It is not commonly found at altitudes above 1,000 m (3,300 ft), although its distribution does include locations at 1,800 m (5,900 ft) in Kenya and 1,650 m (5,410 ft) in Zambia. It is rated as a species of least concern on the International Union for Conservation of Nature (IUCN)'s Red List of endangered species, based on its huge range across sub-Saharan Africa and no documented decline.

== Behaviour and ecology ==
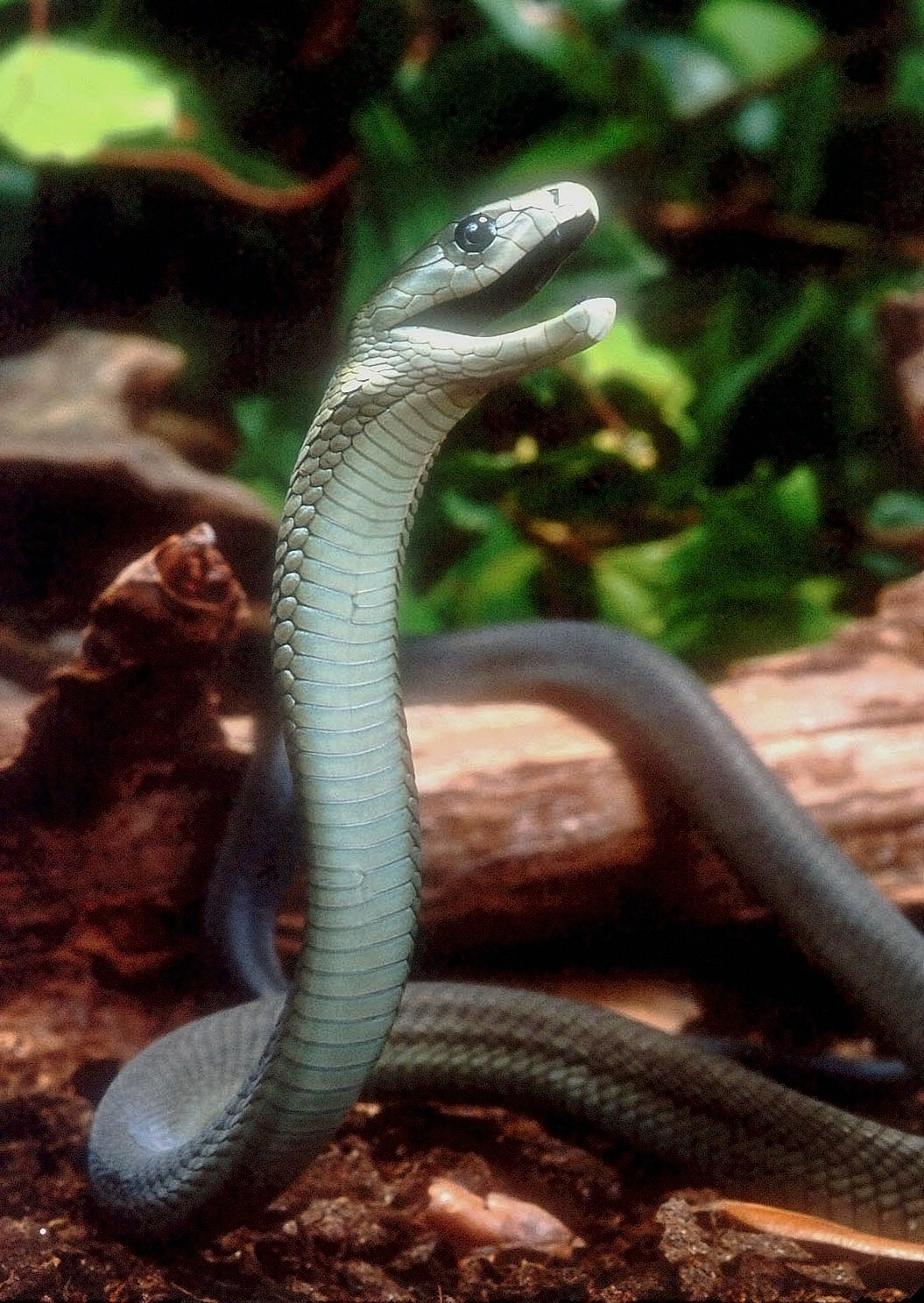
In defensive posture. Like cobras, the neck can be spread into a hood to intimidate potential threats.

The black mamba is both terrestrial and arboreal. On the ground, it moves with its head and neck raised, and typically uses termite mounds, abandoned burrows, rock crevices and tree cracks as shelter. Black mambas are diurnal; in South Africa, they are recorded to bask between 7 and 10 am and again from 2 to 4 pm. They may return daily to the same basking site.

Skittish and often unpredictable, the black mamba is agile and can move quickly. In the wild, black mambas seldom tolerate humans approaching more closely than about 40 metres (130 ft). When it perceives a threat, it retreats into brush or a hole. When confronted, it is likely to engage in a threat display, gaping to expose its black mouth and flicking its tongue. It also is likely to hiss and spread its neck into a hood similar to that of the cobras in the genus Naja.

During the threat display, any sudden movement by the intruder may provoke the snake into performing a series of rapid strikes, leading to severe envenomation. The size of the black mamba and its ability to raise its head a large distance from the ground enables it to launch as much as 40% of its body length upwards, so mamba bites to humans can occur on the upper body. The black mamba's reputation for being ready to attack is exaggerated; it is usually provoked by perceived threats such as the blocking of its movements and ability to retreat. The species' reputed speed has also been exaggerated; it cannot move more quickly than 20 km/h (12 mph).

=== Reproduction and lifespan ===
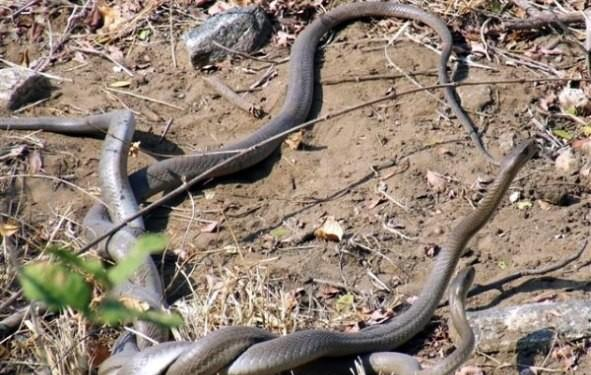
Males engaged in combat

The black mamba's breeding season spans from September to February, following the drop in temperature which occurs from April to June. Rival males compete by wrestling, attempting to subdue each other by intertwining their bodies and wrestling with their necks. Some observers have mistaken this for courtship. During mating, the male will slither over the dorsal side of the female while flicking his tongue. The female will signal her readiness to mate by lifting her tail and staying still. The male will then coil himself around the posterior end of the female and align his tail ventrolaterally with the female's. Intromission may last longer than two hours and the pair remain motionless apart from occasional spasms from the male.

The black mamba is oviparous; the female lays a clutch of 6–17 eggs. The eggs are elongated oval in shape, typically 60–80 mm (2.4–3.1 in) long and 30–36 mm (1.2–1.4 in) in diameter. When hatched, the young range from 40–60 cm (16–24 in) in length. They may grow quickly, reaching 2 m (6 ft 7 in) after their first year. Juvenile black mambas are very apprehensive and can be deadly like the adults. The black mamba is recorded to live up to 11 years and may live longer.

=== Feeding ===
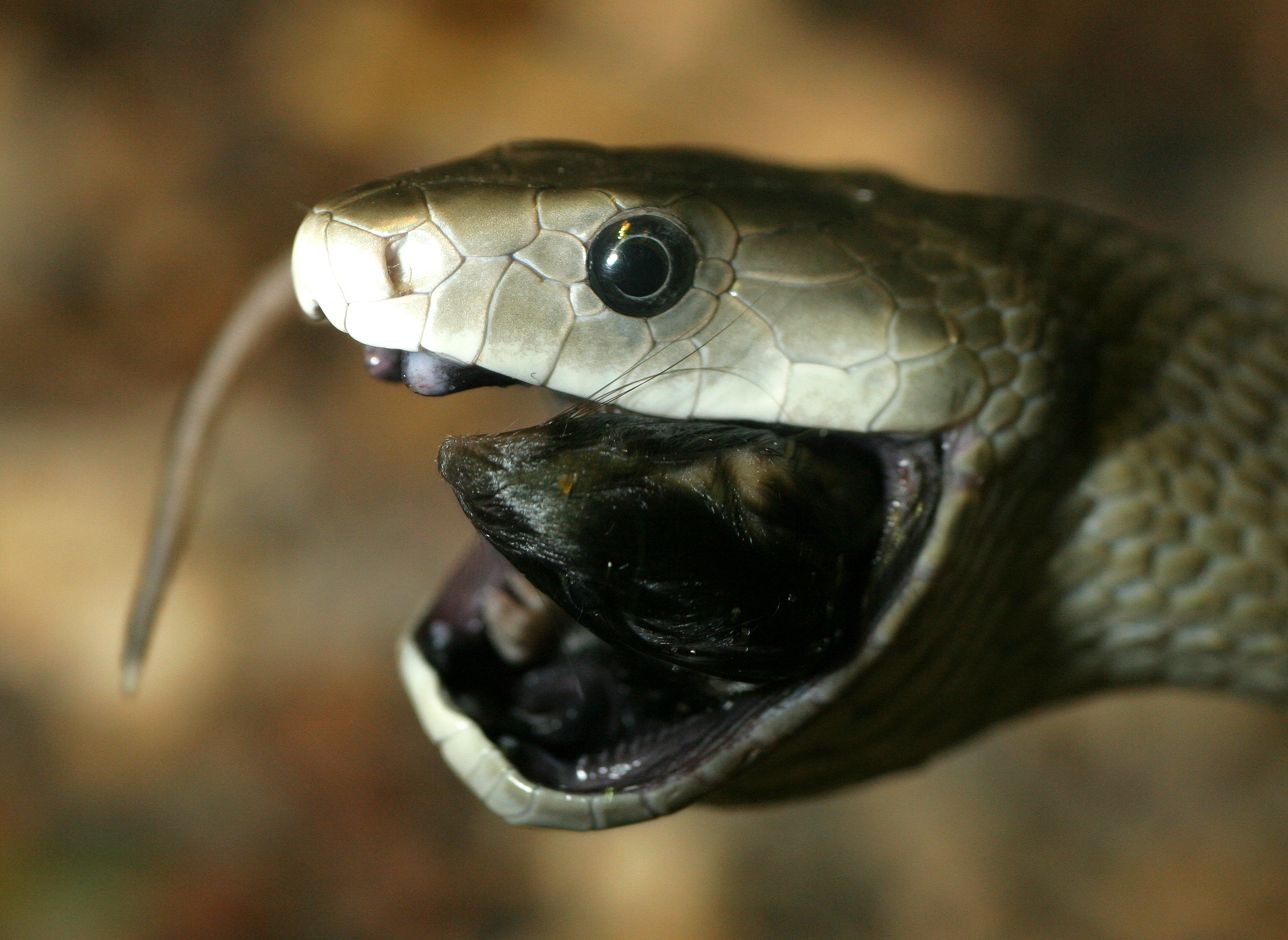
Swallowing prey

The black mamba usually hunts from a permanent lair, to which it will regularly return if there is no disturbance. It mostly preys on small vertebrates such as birds, particularly fledglings, and small mammals like rodents, squirrels, hyraxes and small antelope. They generally prefer warm-blooded prey but will also consume other snakes. In the Transvaal area of South Africa, almost all recorded prey was rather small, largely consisting of rodents, similarly sized small mammals, juvenile common dwarf mongooses, and passerine birds, estimated to weigh only 1.9–7.8% of the mamba's body mass. Nonetheless, anecdotes have indicated that large black mambas may infrequently attack large prey such as the rock hyrax or dassie, and in some tribal languages, its name even means "dassie catcher". The black mamba does not typically hold onto its prey after biting; rather it releases its quarry and waits for it to succumb to paralysis and death before it is swallowed. The snake's potent digestive system has been recorded to fully digest prey in eight to ten hours.

=== Predation ===
Adult mambas have few natural predators aside from birds of prey. Brown snake eagles are verified predators of adult black mambas, of up to at least 2.7 m (8 ft 10 in). Other eagles known to hunt or at least consume grown black mambas include tawny eagles and martial eagles. Young snakes have been recorded as prey of the Cape file snake. Mongooses, which have some resistance to mamba venom and are often quick enough to evade a bite, will sometimes harass or take a black mamba for prey, and may pursue them in trees. The similarly predatory honey badger also has some resistance to mamba venom. The mechanism in both mammals is thought to be that their muscular nicotinic acetylcholine receptors do not bind snake alpha-neurotoxins. Black mambas have also been found amongst the stomach contents of Nile crocodiles. Young mambas in the Serengeti are known to fall prey to southern ground hornbills, marsh owls and hooded vultures.

== Venom ==
The black mamba is the most feared snake in Africa because of its size, aggression, venom toxicity and speed of onset of symptoms following envenomation, and is classified as a snake of medical importance by the World Health Organization. (Note: Snakes of Medical Importance include those with highly dangerous venom resulting in high rates of morbidity and mortality, or those that are common agents in snakebite.) A survey in South Africa from 1957 to 1979 recorded 2,553 venomous snakebites, 75 of which were confirmed as being from black mambas. Of these 75 cases, 63 had symptoms of systemic envenomation and 21 died. Bites were often fatal before antivenom was widely available. Those bitten before 1962 received a polyvalent antivenom that had no effect on black mamba venom, and 15 of 35 people who received the antivenom died. A mamba-specific antivenom was introduced in 1962, followed by a fully polyvalent antivenom in 1971. Over this period, 5 of 38 people bitten by black mambas and given antivenom died. (Note: In two other cases, it was not clear which antivenom had been given) A census in rural Zimbabwe in 1991 and 1992 revealed 274 cases of snakebite, of which 5 died. Black mambas were confirmed in 15 cases, of which 2 died. The peak period for deaths is the species' breeding season from September to February, during which black mambas are most irritable. Bites are very rare outside Africa; snake handlers and enthusiasts are the usual victims.

Unlike many venomous snake species, black mamba venom does not contain protease enzymes. Its bites do not generally cause local swelling or necrosis, and the only initial symptom may be a tingling sensation in the area of the bite. The snake tends to bite repeatedly and let go, so there can be multiple puncture wounds. Its bite can deliver about 100–120 mg of venom on average; the maximum recorded dose is 400 mg. The murine median lethal dose (LD_{50}) when administered intravenously has been calculated at 0.32 and 0.33 mg/kg.

The venom is predominantly neurotoxic, and symptoms often become apparent within 10 minutes. Early neurological signs that indicate severe envenomation include a metallic taste, drooping eyelids (ptosis) and gradual symptoms of bulbar palsy. Other neurological symptoms include miosis (constricted pupils), blurred or diminished vision, paresthesia (a tingling sensation on the skin), dysarthria (slurred speech), dysphagia (difficulty swallowing), dyspnea (shortness of breath), difficulty handling saliva, an absent gag reflex, fasciculations (muscle twitches), ataxia (impaired voluntary movement), vertigo, drowsiness and loss of consciousness, and respiratory paralysis. Other more general symptoms include nausea and vomiting, abdominal pain, diarrhea, sweating, salivation, goosebumps and red eyes. The bite of a black mamba can cause collapse in humans within 45 minutes. Without appropriate antivenom treatment, symptoms typically progress to respiratory failure, which leads to cardiovascular collapse and death. This typically occurs in 7 to 15 hours.

In 2015, the proteome (complete protein profile) of black mamba venom was assessed and published, revealing 41 distinct proteins and one nucleoside. The venom is composed of two main families of toxic agents, dendrotoxins (I and K) and (at a slightly lower proportion) three-finger toxins. Dendrotoxins are akin to kunitz-type protease inhibitors that interact with voltage-dependent potassium channels, stimulating acetylcholine and causing an excitatory effect, and are thought to cause symptoms such as sweating. Members of the three-finger family include alpha-neurotoxin, cardiotoxins, fasciculins and mambalgins. The most toxic components are the alpha-neurotoxins, which bind nicotinic acetylcholine receptors and hence block the action of acetylcholine at the postsynaptic membrane and cause neuromuscular blockade and hence paralysis. Fasciculins are anticholinesterase inhibitors that cause muscle fasciculation. The venom has little or no haemolytic, haemorrhagic or procoagulant activity. Mambalgins act as inhibitors for acid-sensing ion channels in the central and peripheral nervous system, causing a pain-inhibiting effect. There is research interest in their analgesic potential.

The composition of black mamba venom differs markedly from those of other mambas, all of which contain predominantly three-finger toxin agents. It is thought this may reflect the preferred prey items – small mammals for the mainly land-dwelling black mamba versus birds for the other predominantly arboreal mambas. Unlike many snake species, black mamba venom has little phospholipase A2 content.

=== Treatment ===
Standard first aid treatment for any suspected bite from a venomous snake is the application of a pressure bandage to the bite site, minimisation of movement of the victim and conveyance to a hospital or clinic as quickly as possible. The neurotoxic nature of black mamba venom means an arterial tourniquet may be of benefit. Tetanus toxoid is sometimes administered, though the main treatment is the administration of the appropriate antivenom. A polyvalent antivenom produced by the South African Institute for Medical Research is used to treat black mamba bites, and a new antivenom was being developed by the Universidad de Costa Rica's Instituto Clodomiro Picado.

=== Notable bite cases ===
- Danie Pienaar, who was at various times from at least 2009 to 2017 head of South African National Parks Scientific Services and acting managing executive, survived the bite of a black mamba without antivenom in 1998. Despite the hospital physicians having declared it a "moderate" envenomation, Pienaar lapsed into a coma at one point and his prognosis was declared "poor." Upon arrival at the hospital, Pienaar was immediately intubated and placed on life support for 3 days. He was released from the hospital on the fifth day. Remaining calm after being bitten increased his chances of survival, as did the application of a tourniquet.
- In March 2008, 28-year-old British trainee safari guide Nathan Layton was bitten by a black mamba that had been found near his classroom at the Southern African Wildlife College in Hoedspruit, Limpopo, South Africa. Layton was bitten by the snake on his index finger while it was being put into a jar and first aid-trained staff who examined him determined he could carry on with lectures. He thought the snake had only brushed his hand. Layton complained of blurred vision within an hour of being bitten, and collapsed and died shortly afterwards.
- American professional photographer Mark Laita was bitten on the leg by a black mamba, which punctured an artery, during a photo-shoot of several snakes at a facility in Central America. Bleeding profusely, he did not seek medical attention, and except for intense pain and local swelling overnight, he was not affected. This led him to believe that either the snake gave him a "dry bite" (a bite without injecting venom) or the heavy bleeding did not allow the venom to enter his bloodstream. Some commenters on the story suggested that the snake was a venomoid (in which the venom glands are surgically removed), but Laita responded that it was not. Only later did Laita find that he had captured the snake biting his leg in a photograph.
- In 2016, Kenyan woman Cheposait Adomo was attacked by three black mambas, one of which bit her repeatedly on the leg, in West Pokot County, Kenya. People coming to her aid drove off the other snakes, hacking two with a machete. After an attempt at using traditional medicine, they placed her on a motorcycle and conveyed her 45 minutes to the nearest hospital, which had antivenom. She survived.
- In 2017, a 31-year-old man named Arslan Valeev died in Saint Petersburg, Russia, after enticing a pet black mamba to bite him live on webcam in an apparent suicide.
- Prominent South African anti-Apartheid activist and Labour Court judge Anton Steenkamp died after being bitten by a black mamba while on leave in Zambia in May 2019. He was several hours away from medical help and died before antivenom could be administered.
- In June 2020, Bulgarian veterinarian Georgi Elenski from Haskovo was bitten by a black mamba that was part of his personal collection of exotic animals. His initial condition was very serious, but he recovered after extensive treatment involving the administering of antivenom and respiratory support.
- In January 2022, a former newspaper office worker and farmer from Zimbabwe, Peter Dube, died after getting bitten by a black mamba, due to the hospital he was taken to not having any antivenom to treat him.
- In January 2023, a 17-year-old student from Zimbabwe died after being bitten by a black mamba. The snake had gone into a high school classroom while the students were outside.
