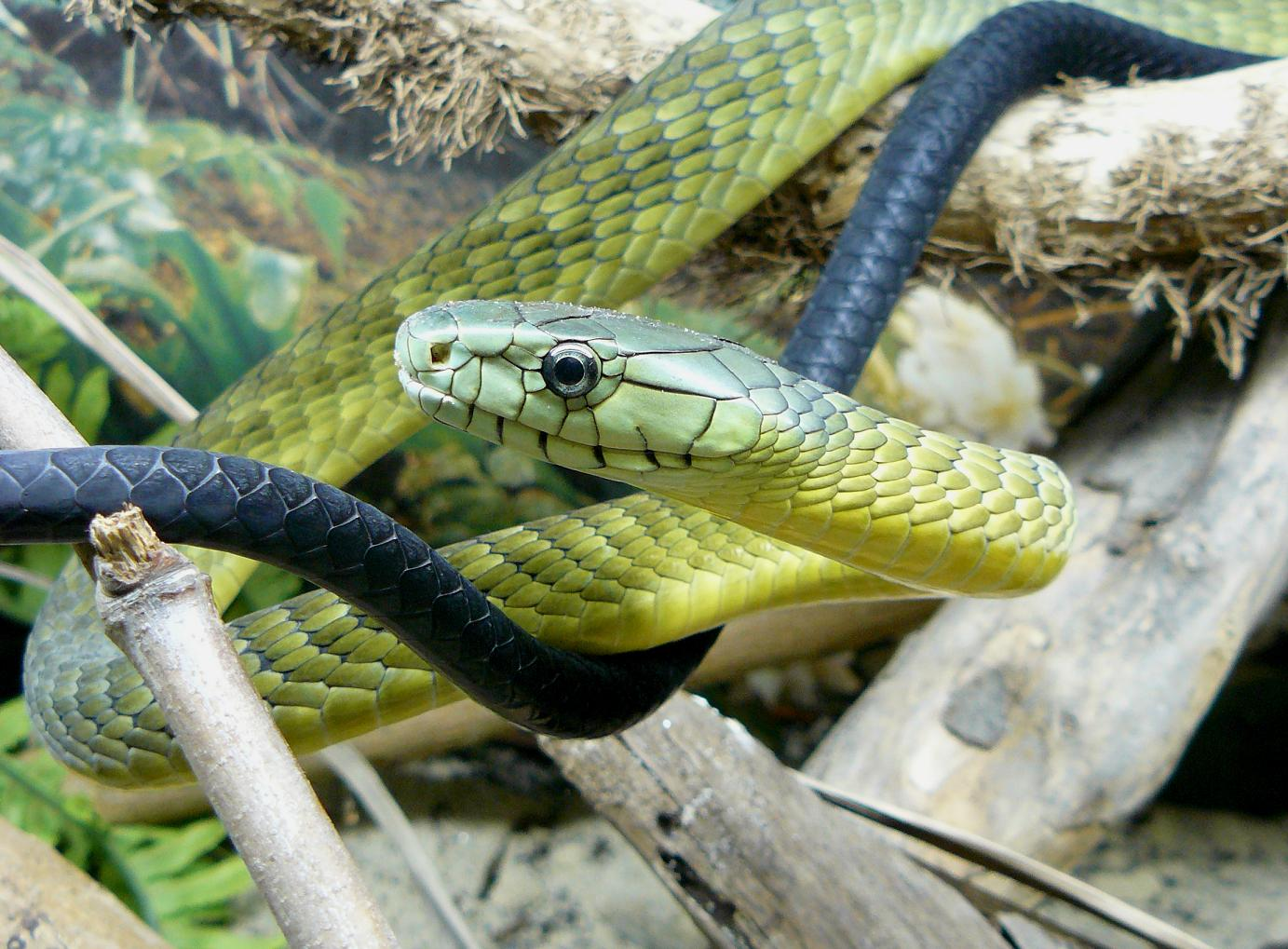

Conservation status
- Least Concern (IUCN 3.1)

Scientific classification
- Kingdom: Animalia
- Phylum: Chordata
- Class: Reptilia
- Order: Squamata
- Suborder: Serpentes
- Family: Elapidae
- Genus: Dendroaspis
- Species: D. jamesoni

Binomial name
- Dendroaspis jamesoni (Traill, 1843)
- Range of Jameson's mamba

Synonyms
- Elaps jamesoni Traill, 1843; Dendraspis jamesoni — Günther, 1858; Dendroaspis jamesoni — Schmidt, 1923

= Jameson's mamba =

Species of snake

Jameson's mamba (Dendroaspis jamesoni) is a species of highly venomous snake in the family Elapidae. The species is native to equatorial Africa. A member of the mamba genus, Dendroaspis, it is slender with dull green upper parts and cream underparts and generally ranges from 1.5 to 2.2 m (4.9 to 7.2 ft) in total length. Described by Scottish naturalist Thomas Traill in 1843, it has two recognised subspecies. The nominate subspecies is found in central and western sub-Saharan Africa, and the eastern black-tailed subspecies is found eastern sub-Saharan Africa, mainly western Kenya.

Predominantly arboreal, Jameson's mamba preys mainly on birds and mammals. Its venom consists of both neurotoxins and cardiotoxins. Symptoms of envenomation in humans include pain and swelling at the bite site, followed by swelling, chills, sweating, abdominal pain and vomiting, with subsequent slurred speech, difficulty breathing and paralysis. Fatalities have been recorded within three to four hours of being bitten. The venom of the eastern subspecies is around twice as potent as that of the nominate subspecies.

== Taxonomy and etymology ==
Jameson's mamba was first described as Elaps jamesoni in 1843 by Thomas Traill, a Scottish doctor, zoologist and scholar of medical jurisprudence. The specific epithet is in honour of Robert Jameson, Traill's contemporary and the Regius Professor of Natural History at the University of Edinburgh where Traill studied. In 1848, German naturalist Hermann Schlegel created the genus Dendroaspis, designating Jameson's mamba as the type species. The generic name is derived from the Ancient Greek words δένδρον (dendron, 'tree') and ἀσπίς (aspis 'asp'). The genus was misspelt as Dendraspis by French zoologist Auguste Duméril in 1856, and went generally uncorrected by subsequent authors. In 1936, Dutch herpetologist Leo Brongersma corrected the spelling to the original.

In 1936, British biologist Arthur Loveridge described a new subspecies D. jamesoni kaimosae, from a specimen collected from the Kaimosi Forest in western Kenya, observing that it had fewer subcaudal scales and a black (rather than green) tail. Analysis of the components of the venom of all mambas places Jameson's mamba as sister species to the western green mamba (Dendroaspis viridis), as shown in the cladogram below.

- - - king cobra (Ophiophagus hannah)
  - - - - Jameson's mamba – western subspecies (Dendroaspis j. jamesoni)
        - Jameson's mamba – eastern subspecies (Dendroaspis j. kaimosae)
      - western green mamba (Dendroaspis viridis)
    - - eastern green mamba (Dendroaspis angusticeps)
      - black mamba (Dendroaspis polylepis)

== Description ==
Jameson's mamba is a long and slender snake with smooth scales and a tail which typically accounts for 20 to 25% of its total length. The total length (including tail) of an adult snake is approximately 1.5–2.2 m (4 ft 11 in – 7 ft 3 in). It may grow as large as 2.64 m (8 ft 8 in). The general consensus is that the sexes are of similar sizes, although fieldwork in southeastern Nigeria found that males were significantly larger than females. Adults tend to be dull green across the back, blending to pale green towards the underbelly with scales generally edged with black. The neck, throat and underparts are typically cream or yellowish in colour. Jameson's mamba has a narrow and elongated head containing small eyes and round pupils. Like the western green mamba, the neck may be flattened. The subspecies D. jamesoni kaimosae, which is found in the eastern part of the species' range, features a black tail, while central and western examples typically have a pale green or yellow tail. The thin fangs are attached to the upper jaw and have a furrow running down their anterior surface.

=== Scalation ===
The number and pattern of scales on a snake's body play a key role in the identification and differentiation at the species level. Jameson's mamba has between 15 and 17 rows of dorsal scales at midbody, 210 to 236 (Subsp.) jamesoni) or 202 to 227 ventral scales (Subsp. kaimosae), 94 to 122 (Subsp. jamesoni) or 94 to 113 (Subsp. kaimosae) divided subcaudal scales, and a divided anal scale. (Note: A divided scale is one split down the midline into two scales.) Its mouth is lined with 7 to 9 (usually 8) supralabial scales above and 8 to 10 (usually 9) sublabial scales below, the fourth ones located over and under the eye. Its eyes have three preocular, three postocular and one subocular scale.

== Distribution and habitat ==
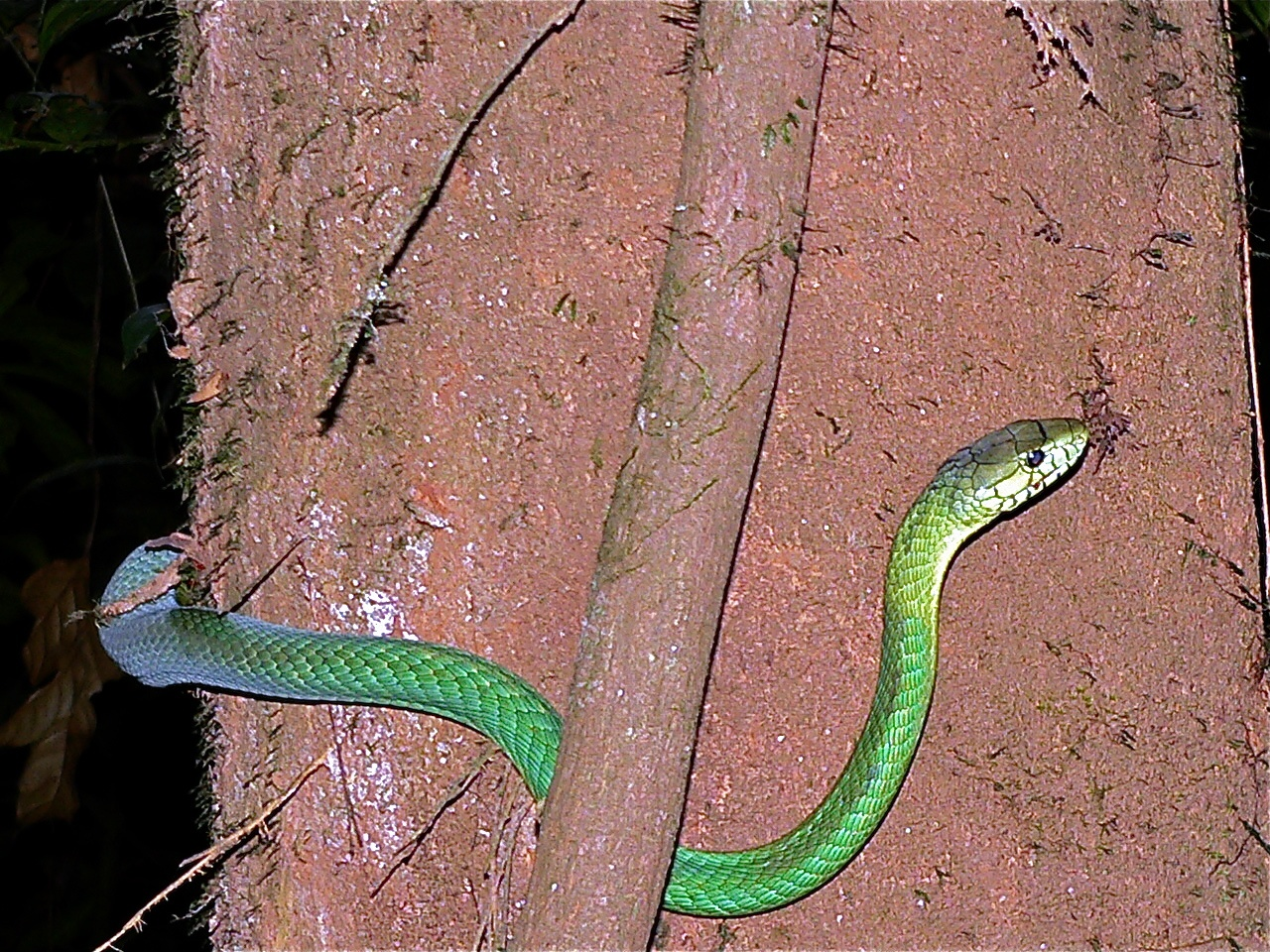
Subsp. jamesoni navigating a tree, Korup National Park

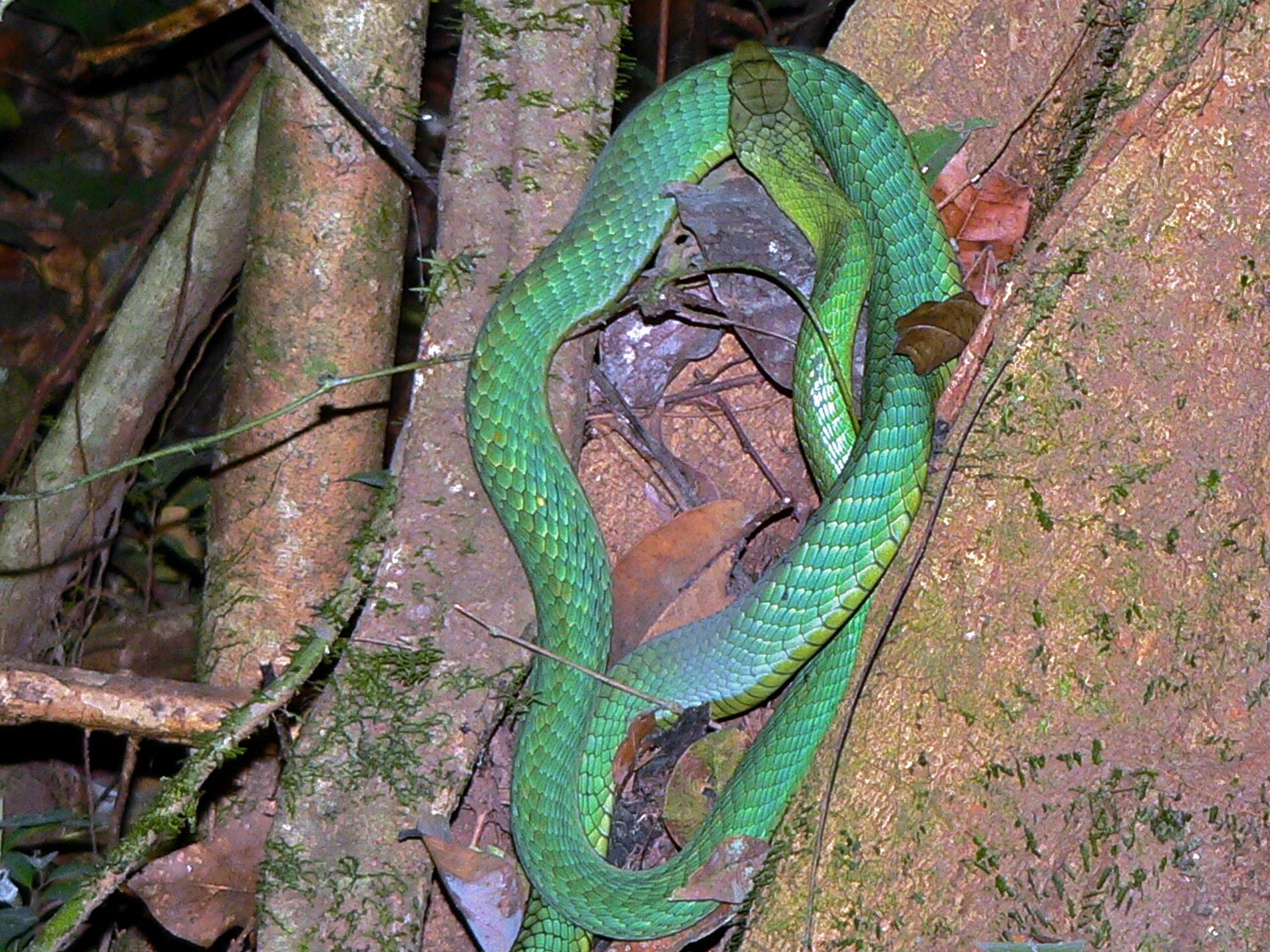
Dorsal view of scales

Jameson's mamba occurs mostly in Central Africa and West Africa, and in some parts of East Africa. In Central Africa it can be found from Angola northwards to the Democratic Republic of the Congo, Republic of the Congo, Central African Republic, and as far north as the Imatong Mountains of South Sudan. In West Africa it ranges from Ghana eastwards to Togo, Nigeria, Cameroon, Equatorial Guinea and Gabon. In East Africa it can be found in Uganda, Kenya, Rwanda, Burundi and Tanzania. The subspecies D. jamesoni kaimosae is endemic to East Africa and chiefly found in western Kenya, where its type locality is located, as well as in Uganda, Rwanda, and the adjacent Democratic Republic of the Congo. It is a relatively common and widespread snake, particularly across its western range. Fieldwork in Nigeria indicated the species is sedentary.

Found in primary and secondary rainforests, woodland, forest-savanna and deforested areas at elevations of up to 2,200 metres (7,200 ft) high, Jameson's mamba is an adaptable species; it persists in areas where there has been extensive deforestation and human development. It is often found around buildings, town parks, farmlands and plantations. Jameson's mamba is a highly arboreal snake, more so than its close relatives the eastern green mamba and western green mamba, and significantly more so than the black mamba.

== Behaviour and ecology ==
Jameson's mamba is a highly agile snake. Like other mambas it is capable of flattening its neck in mimicry of a cobra when it feels threatened, and its body shape and length give an ability to strike at significant range. Generally not aggressive, it will typically attempt to escape if confronted.

=== Breeding ===
In Nigeria males fight each other for access to females (and then breed) over the dry season of December, January and February; mating was recorded in September in the Kakamega Forest in Kenya. Jameson's mamba is oviparous; the female lays a clutch of 5–16 eggs; in Nigeria laying was recorded from April to June, and most likely soon after November in Uganda. Egg clutches have been recovered from abandoned termite colonies.

=== Diet and predators ===
Jameson's mamba has been difficult to study in the field due to its arboreal nature and green coloration. It has not been observed hunting but is thought to use a sit-and-wait strategy, which has been reported for the eastern green mamba. The bulk of its diet is made up of birds and tree-dwelling mammals, such as cisticolas, woodpeckers, doves, squirrels, shrews and mice. Smaller individuals of under 100 cm (40 in) in length have been recorded feeding on lizards such as the common agama, and toads. There is no evidence they have adapted to hunting terrestrial rodents such as rats, though they have been recorded eating rodents in Kenya, and have accepted them in captivity.

The main predators of this species are birds of prey, including the martial eagle, bateleur, and the Congo serpent eagle. Other predators may include the honey badger, other snakes, and species of mongoose.

== Venom ==
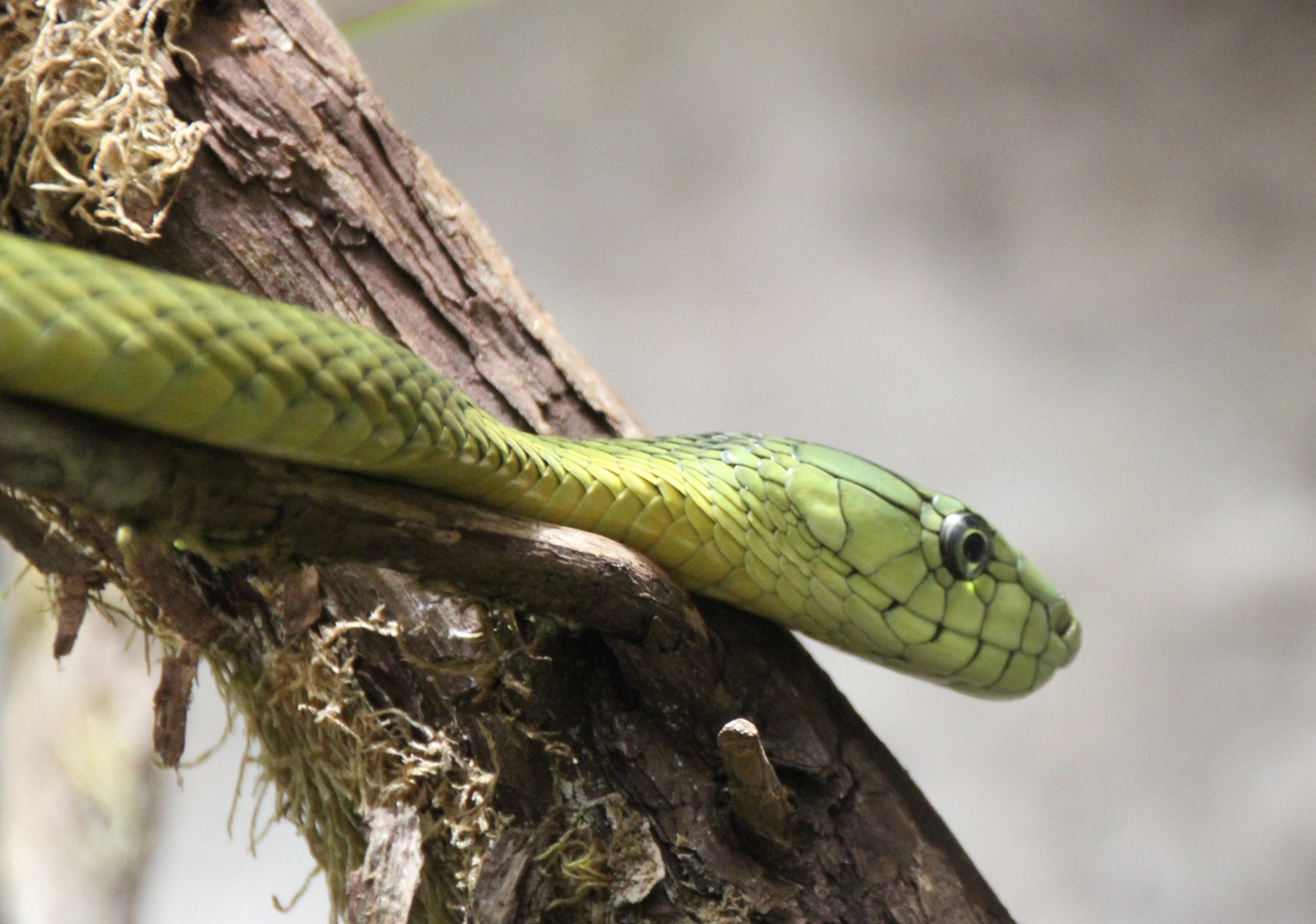
Subsp. kaimosae, the more venomous subspecies

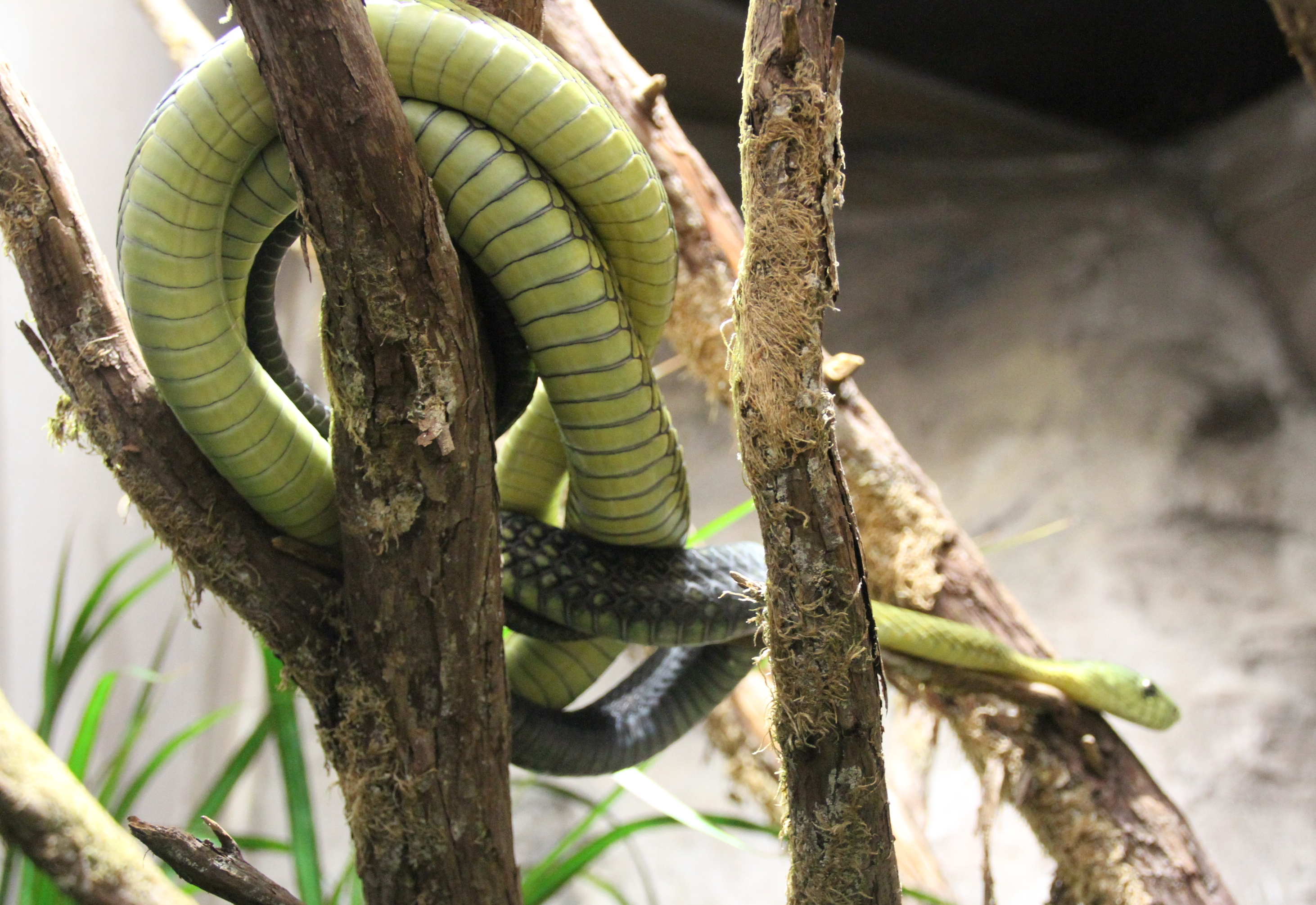
Subsp. kaimosae from beneath, showing ventral scales

Jameson's mamba is classified as a Snake of Medical Importance in Sub-Saharan Africa by the World Health Organization, (Note: Snakes of medical Importance include those with highly dangerous venom resulting in high rates of morbidity and mortality, or those that are common agents in snakebite.) although there are few records of snakebites. Field observations over a 16-year period in the Niger Delta in southern Nigeria found that both humans and snakes were most active in rural areas during the rainy season, April to August, hence rendering this a peak period for snakebite. As well as succumbing to snakebites, workers were reported to have perished from falling from trees after encountering Jameson's mambas in the canopy of trees in palm oil plantations. Snake bites are rare in cities but more common in forested areas in countries such as the Democratic Republic of the Congo; the country's poor infrastructure and lack of facilities render access to antivenom difficult.

Like other mambas, the venom of the Jameson's mamba is highly neurotoxic. Symptoms of envenomation by this species include pain and swelling of the bite site. Systemic effects include generalised swelling, chills, sweating, abdominal pain and vomiting, with subsequent slurred speech, difficulty breathing, and paralysis. Death has been recorded within three to four hours of being bitten; there is an unconfirmed report of a child dying within 30 minutes. With an average intravenous murine median lethal dose (LD_{50}) of 0.53 mg/kg, (Note: The strength or toxicity of snake venom is traditionally measured using the LD50 (lethal dose 50%) test; in essence, injecting a certain amount of toxin into number of mice and recording what dose kills half of them.) the venom of the eastern subspecies kaimosae is more than twice as potent as that of the nominate subspecies jamesoni at 1.2 mg/kg. The reason for this is unclear as the venom compositions are similar between the two subspecies, though kaimosae has higher concentrations of the potent neurotoxin-1.

Similarly to the venom of most other mambas, Jameson's mamba's contains predominantly three-finger toxin agents as well as dendrotoxins. Other toxins of the three-finger family present include alpha-neurotoxin, cardiotoxins and fasciculins. Dendrotoxins are akin to kunitz-type protease inhibitors that interact with voltage-dependent potassium channels, stimulating acetylcholine and causing an excitatory effect, and are thought to cause symptoms such as sweating. Unlike that of many snake species, the venom of mambas has little phospholipase A2. Although cardiotoxins have been isolated in higher proportions from its venom than other mamba species, their role in toxicity is unclear and probably not prominent.

=== Treatment ===
The speed of onset of envenomation means that urgent medical attention is needed. Standard first aid treatment for any bite from a suspected venomous snake is the application of a pressure bandage, minimisation of the victim's movement, and rapid conveyance to a hospital or clinic. Due to the neurotoxic nature of green mamba venom, an arterial tourniquet may be beneficial. Tetanus toxoid is sometimes administered, though the main treatment is the administration of the appropriate antivenom. Trivalent and monovalent (Note: A monovalent antivenom is specific for one toxin or species, while a polyvalent one is effective against multiple toxins or species.) antivenoms for the black, eastern green, and Jameson's mambas became available in the 1950s and 1960s.
