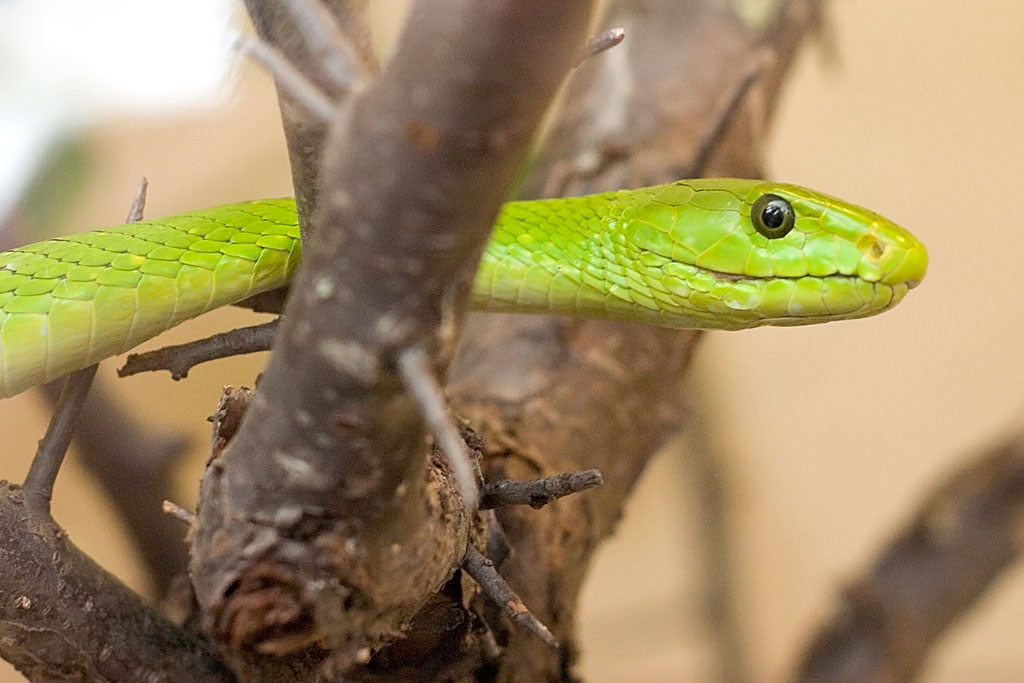

Conservation status
- Least Concern (IUCN 3.1)

Scientific classification
- Kingdom: Animalia
- Phylum: Chordata
- Class: Reptilia
- Order: Squamata
- Suborder: Serpentes
- Family: Elapidae
- Genus: Dendroaspis
- Species: D. angusticeps

Binomial name
- Dendroaspis angusticeps (A. Smith, 1849)
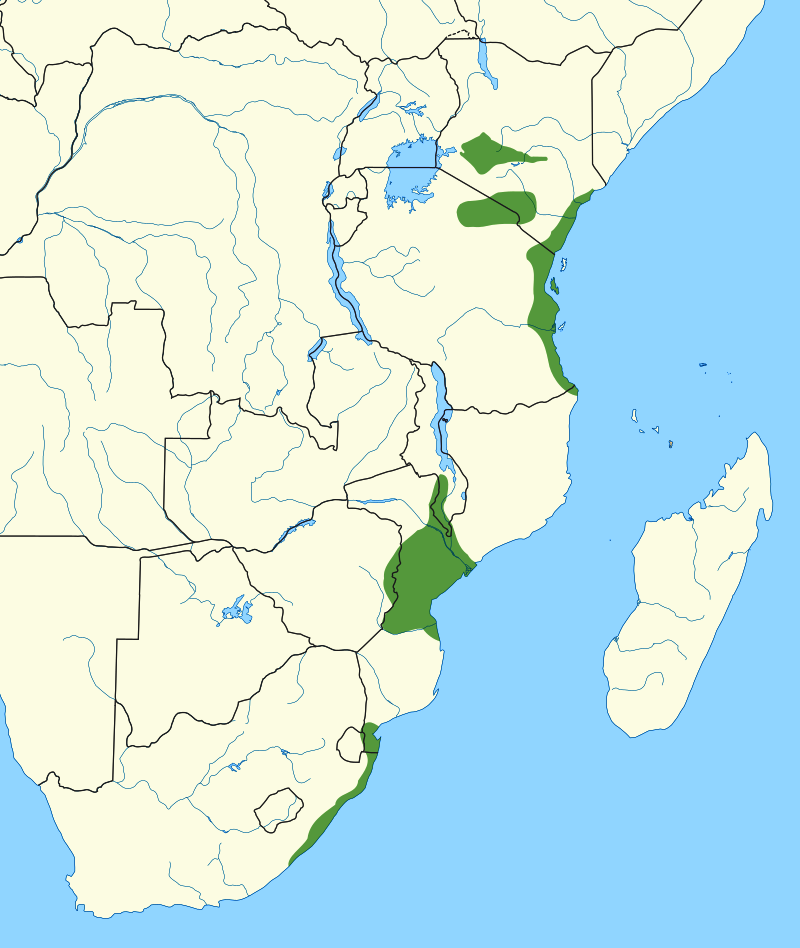
- geographic range

Synonyms
- List: Naja angusticeps — Smith, 1849; Naja angusticeps — Duméril & Bibron, 1854; Dendraphis angusticeps — Günther, 1858; Dendrospis [sic] angusticeps — Boulenger, 1897; Dendroaspis sjöstedti — Lönnberg, 1910; Dendraspis [sic] angusticeps — Sternfeld, 1910; Dendroaspis angusticeps — Razetti & Msuya, 2002

= Eastern green mamba =

Species of venomous snake

The eastern green mamba (Dendroaspis angusticeps) is a highly venomous snake species of the mamba genus Dendroaspis native to the coastal regions of southern East Africa. Described by Scottish surgeon and zoologist Andrew Smith in 1849, it has a slender build with a bright green back and green-yellow ventral scales. Adult females average around 2 metres (6 ft 7 in) in length, and males are slightly smaller.

In spite of common urban legends and misconceptions labeling the eastern green mamba an aggressive, fast-moving "people-chaser", it is in fact a shy and elusive species that remains hidden in the trees, and is rarely seen. This seclusion is usually attributed to its arboreal habitat and green colouration, which acts as effective camouflage in its natural environment. Even with its deadly venom, the green mamba has to protect itself from predators, including birds of prey and other snakes, such as cobras. It has been observed engaging in ambush predation, a trait seen among many Viperidae species, contrary to the active hunting style typical of other Elapidae snakes. It preys on arboreal and winged animals, such as birds and their chicks and eggs, bats, and arboreal rodents such as mice, rats, and gerbils.

Eastern green mamba venom consists of both neurotoxins and cardiotoxins. Symptoms of envenomation include swelling of the immediate bite-wound area, dizziness, vertigo and nausea, accompanied by dehydration, labored breathing and difficult swallowing. This eventually will develop into arrhythmia and convulsions—all progressing to respiratory paralysis, which results in a fatal lack of oxygen to the brain. Bites that are severe if not immediately treated on-site can quickly prove deadly.

== Taxonomy ==
The eastern green mamba was first described as Naja angusticeps by Andrew Smith, a Scottish surgeon and zoologist, in 1849, who reported it from Natal and east to Maputo Bay. The specific name angusticeps is derived from the Latin word angustus, "narrow", and ceps, an abbreviated form of caput ("head") when used in a compound word. The German-British zoologist Albert Günther described Dendroaspis intermedius from the Zambezi River in northern Mozambique in 1865. This was subsequently synonymised with D. angusticeps.

In 1896, the Belgian-British zoologist George Albert Boulenger combined the species Dendroaspis angusticeps with the black mamba (Dendroaspis polylepis), a lumping diagnosis that remained in force until 1946, when the South African herpetologist Vivian FitzSimons published a paper after examining approximately 50 eastern green mamba and 85 black mamba specimens. He concluded that the differences in build, scalation, colouration and behaviour warranted splitting them into separate species. The British biologist Arthur Loveridge augmented FitzSimons' work with material from outside South Africa, noting some overlap in scalation but supporting the separation. A 2016 genetic analysis showed the eastern green and black mambas are each others' closest relatives, their common ancestor diverging from a lineage that gave rise to Jameson's mamba (Dendroaspis jamesoni) and the western green mamba (Dendroaspis viridis), as shown in the cladogram below.

- - - Ophiophagus hannah
  - - - - Dendroaspis j. jamesoni
        - Dendroaspis j. kaimosae
      - Dendroaspis viridis
    - - Dendroaspis angusticeps
      - Dendroaspis polylepis

As well as being called the eastern green mamba, the species is also frequently known as the common green mamba, East African green mamba, white-mouthed mamba, or simply the green mamba.

== Description ==
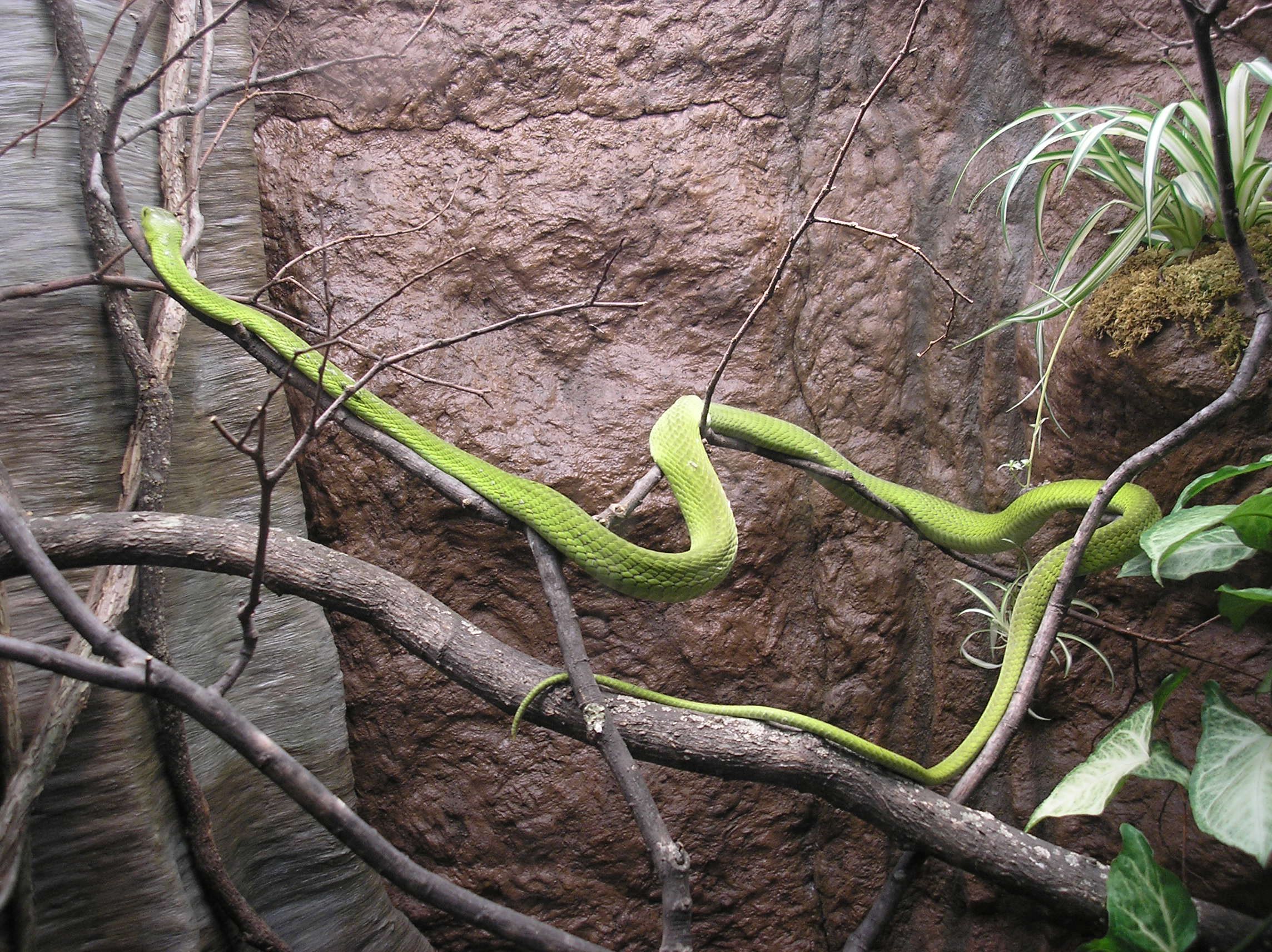
An eastern green mamba

The eastern green mamba is a large snake, with a slightly compressed and very slender body with a medium to long tapering tail. Adult males average around 1.8 metres (5 ft 11 in) in total length, while females average 2.0 metres (6 ft 7 in). This species rarely exceeds lengths of 2.5 metres (8 ft 2 in). In general, the total length is 4–4.3 times the length of the tail. The adult eastern green mamba has bright green upperparts—occasionally with isolated yellow scales—and a pale yellow-green belly. Sometimes they are duller-coloured before moulting. Juveniles are blue-green, becoming bright green when they are around 75 centimetres (2 ft 6 in) long. The coffin-shaped head is long and slender, with a prominent canthus which is slightly demarcated from the neck. When threatened or otherwise aroused, the eastern green mamba is capable of flattening its neck area into a slight hood. The medium-sized eyes have round pupils, the borders of which have a narrow golden or ochre edge; the irises are olive green, becoming bright green posteriorly. The inside of the mouth may be white or bluish-white.

Other green snakes are often called "green mambas" in Southern Africa, including green forms of the boomslang (Dispholidus typus), which can be distinguished by their larger eyes and shorter heads. They are also venomous. Green bush snakes of the genus Philothamnus are also commonly confused with smaller Eastern green mambas.

=== Scalation ===
The number and pattern of scales on a snake's body are a key element of identification to species level. The eastern green mamba has between 17 and 21 rows of dorsal scales at midbody, 201 to 232 ventral scales, 99 to 126 divided subcaudal scales, and a divided anal scale. (Note: A divided scale is one split down the midline into two scales.) Its mouth is lined with 7–9 supralabial scales above, the fourth one located under the eye, and 9–11 sublabial scales below. Its eyes have three preocular and 3–5 postocular scales.

== Distribution and habitat ==
The eastern green mamba is native to regions near the coastlines of Southern Africa and East Africa. Its range extends from Kenya south through Tanzania, Malawi, eastern Zimbabwe and parts of Zambia; it can also be found in Zanzibar and northern Mozambique. An isolated and genetically distinct population is found in South Africa from the extreme northeastern part of Eastern Cape along the KwaZulu-Natal coastline and into southern Mozambique.

An elusive species, it is primarily arboreal (living in trees) and usually well camouflaged in foliage. Some herpetologists believe its habitat is limited to tropical rainforests in coastal lowlands. Other experts believe it can also be found in coastal bush, and dune and montane forest. Unlike its close relative the black mamba, the eastern green mamba is rarely found in open terrain and prefers relatively dense, well-shaded vegetation. As well as wild forest habitats, it is also commonly found in thickets and farm trees such as citrus, mango, coconut, and cashew. In coastal East Africa, it is known to enter houses and may even shelter in thatched-roof dwellings. Specimens have been found at elevations up to 1,500 metres (4,900 ft) above sea level.

== Behaviour and ecology ==
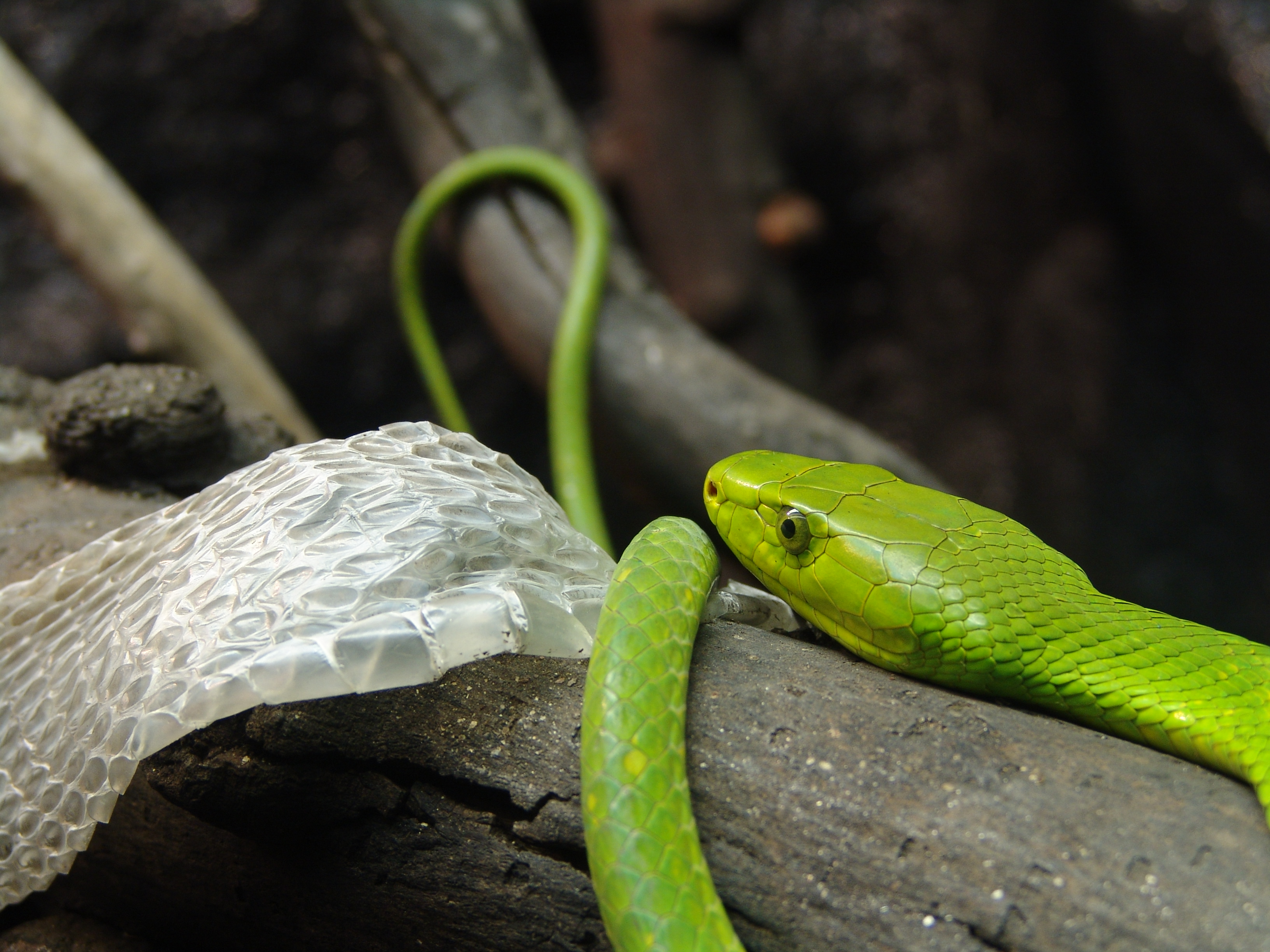
A green mamba at a German serpentarium next to shed skin

A diurnal species, the eastern green mamba is active by day and sleeps at night coiled up in foliage or rarely a hollow within the trunk or branch. An agile snake and an adept climber, it is not often found on the ground though may come down to bask in the morning sun (thermoregulation). A 27-day study of the movement patterns of two adults found their activity area to be relatively small, comparable to other predators who ambush prey rather than hunt (in contrast to most elapid species, including other mambas, who tend to hunt and forage). The study's preliminary evidence shed light on the species' feeding methods, suggesting it may be primarily an ambush predator due to its sit-and-wait behaviour. This evidence does not preclude active foraging, however; a specimen was also observed systematically hunting a sleeping bat.

There is no evidence that the eastern green mamba migrates. Thought to be relatively sedentary, it can remain in the same location for days, apparently moving most commonly to find food or mates. On average, individuals move only about 5.4 metres (18 ft) per day. They generally avoid contact with people and other predators, attacking them only if they feel threatened.

=== Reproduction and lifespan ===
The eastern green mamba is solitary except during breeding season. Gravid females tend to be sedentary, but males actively seek and court prospective mates during the rainy season between April and June. Males have been seen engaging in agonistic behaviour; they may fight each other over mating opportunities, or possibly to establish a dominance hierarchy. Typically, one male initiates a fight by moving on top of the other's body and tongue-flicking, after which the two entwine and push, attempt to pin the other's head to the ground. Male combat can last for several hours, but is less aggressive than that commonly seen in the black mamba; combatants do not bite each other.

Males locate females by following a scent trail. The male courts the female by aligning his body along the female's while rapidly tongue-flicking. If the female is receptive to mating, she lifts her tail; cloacal juxtaposition follows. Courtship and mating take place in trees, after which the female can lay 4–17 eggs (10–15 on average), occurring in October and November. The eggs are small and elongated, usually 47–58 x 25–28 mm, and usually laid in leaf litter in hollow trees. The incubation period is around three months. When the young emerge, they are approximately 30 to 45 cm (12 to 18 in) in the wild, and 44 cm (17 in) in captivity. They usually reach adult colouration at 75 cm (30 in). Hatchlings tend to grow to 50 to 80 cm (20 to 31 in) in their first year. As they age, their growth rates decrease but never completely stop.

The oldest recorded eastern green mamba was a captive specimen that lived 18.8 years. Another captive specimen lived 14 years.

=== Diet ===
The eastern green mamba preys primarily on birds and their eggs, and small mammals including bats. It is also believed to eat arboreal lizards. It uses a sit-and-wait strategy, though one specimen was recorded actively hunting sleeping bats. The species is also known to raid the nests of young birds. Sit-and-wait tactics may be successful with highly mobile prey, such as adult birds or rodents. Documented prey include the sombre greenbul, which occur in dense areas of natural and cultivated vegetation along Kenya's coastline. Ionides and Pitman (1965) reported a large bushveld gerbil in the stomach of a green mamba in Tanzania. Although the bushveld gerbil does not occur in Kenya, green mambas prey on the seven species of gerbil that inhabit parts of its range.

=== Predators ===
The eastern green mamba has few natural predators. Humans, mongooses, snake eagles and genets commonly prey on it, and hornbills and other snakes prey on juveniles.

== Venom ==
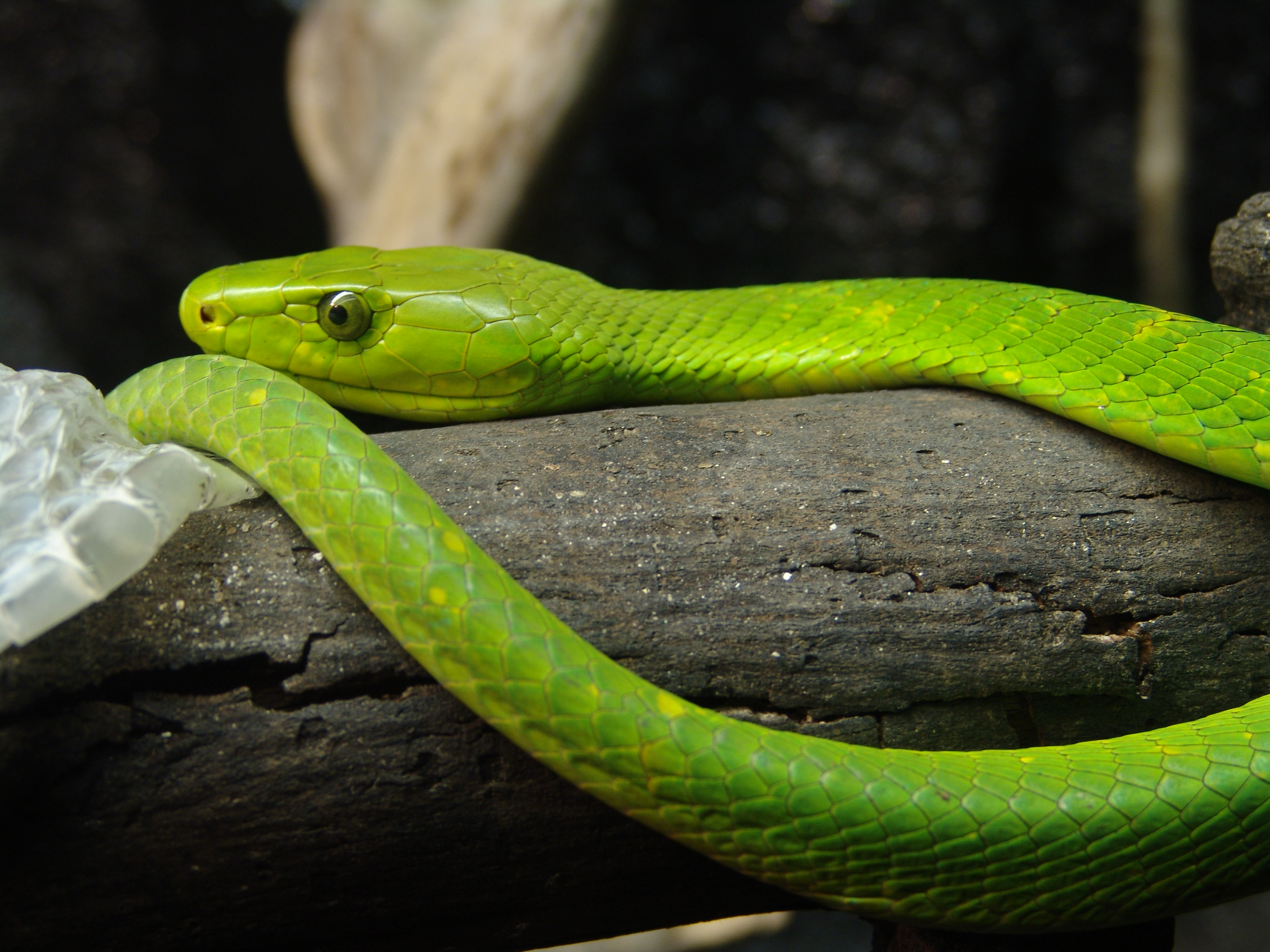
The eastern green mamba has a rapid-acting venom.

The eastern green mamba has the least toxic venom of the three green mamba species, but it is still highly venomous. Although the most commonly encountered green mamba, it generally avoids people. The peak period for bites is the species' breeding season from September to February, during which they are most irritable. A survey in southern Africa from 1957–1979 recorded 2,553 venomous snakebites, 17 of which were confirmed as eastern green mambas. Of these 17, 10 had symptoms of systemic envenomation, though no victims died. The snake tends to bite repeatedly, and one bite can contain 60–95 mg of venom by dry weight. The median lethal dose (LD_{50}) in mice is 1.3 mg/kg through the subcutaneous route, and 0.45 mg/kg through the IV route. The average dose able to kill a human is about 18–20 mg. In 2024, Youtuber Graham 'Dingo' Dinkelman died after he was bitten by the Eastern green mamba that eventually left him in an induced coma following anaphylactic shock.

Symptoms of envenomation by this species include pain and swelling of the bite site, which can progress to local necrosis or gangrene. Systemic effects include dizziness and nausea, difficulty breathing and swallowing, irregular heartbeat, and convulsions. Neurotoxic symptoms such as paralysis may be mild or absent.

In 2015, the proteome (complete protein profile) of eastern green mamba venom was assessed and published, revealing 42 distinct proteins and the nucleoside adenosine. The predominant agents are those of the three-finger toxin family, including aminergic toxins, which act on muscarinic and adrenergic receptors, and fasciculins, which are anticholinesterase inhibitors that cause muscle fasciculation. Another prominent component is a group of proteins known as dendrotoxins; although structurally homologous to Kunitz-type protease inhibitors, they block voltage-dependent potassium channels, stimulating the release of acetylcholine and causing an excitatory effect. Another Kunitz-type protein present is calcicludine, which blocks high-voltage-activated calcium channels. Individually, most of these components do not exhibit potent toxicity in vitro, but are thought to have a synergistic effect in nature.

Similarly to the venom of most other mambas, the eastern green mamba's contains predominantly three-finger toxin agents. The exception is the black mamba, whose venom lacks the potent alpha-neurotoxin as well. It is thought this may reflect the species' preferred prey—small mammals for the mainly land-dwelling black mamba, versus birds for the other predominantly arboreal mambas. Unlike that of many snake species, the venom of mambas has little phospholipase A2.

=== Treatment ===
Standard first aid treatment for any bite from a snake suspected to be venomous is the application of a pressure bandage, minimisation of the victim's movement, and rapid conveyance to a hospital or clinic. Due to the neurotoxic nature of green mamba venom, an arterial tourniquet may be beneficial. Tetanus toxoid is sometimes administered, though the main treatment is the administration of the appropriate antivenom. A polyvalent antivenom produced by the South African Institute for Medical Research is used to treat eastern green mamba bites.

== Conservation status ==
The species' conservation status has not been assessed by the International Union for Conservation of Nature (IUCN). It is fairly common throughout its range, and populations are believed to be stable. Large concentrations of two to three individuals per hectare have been documented in coastal Kenya and southern Tanzania, and in one instance a group of five were seen in a single tree. Although populations are stable overall, habitat destruction and deforestation may pose a threat. In South Africa, it is rated as "vulnerable" as its habitat had become highly fragmented by coastal housing development.
