= Calcicludine =

Snake venom toxin

Calcicludine (CaC) is a protein toxin from the venom of the green mamba that inhibits high-voltage-activated calcium channels, especially L-type calcium channels.

== Sources ==
Calcicludine is a toxin in the venom of the green mamba (Dendroaspis angusticeps).

== Chemistry ==
Calcicludine is a 60-amino acid polypeptide with six cysteines forming three disulfide bridges. Calcicludine structurally resembles dendrotoxin, but works differently, since even at high concentrations, calcicludine has no effect on dendrotoxin-sensitive potassium channels in chicken and rat neurons.

== Target ==
Calcicludine is a blocker of high-voltage-activated calcium channels (L-, N- and P-type channels). It has highest affinity to the L-type calcium channel (IC_{50} = 88nM[2]). However, sensitivity of the drug on the channel depends on the species and the tissue. For example, the IC_{50} for block of L-type calcium channels on a cerebellar granule cell is 0.2 nM, but the IC_{50} of the block of rat peripheral DRG neuronal L-type channels is around 60-80 nM.

== Mode of Action ==
Calcicludine has a unique mode of action, which is still incompletely understood. It has been suggested to act by a partial pore block or an effect on channel gating.

== Toxicity ==
Calcicludine has been shown to work on rat cardiac cells and rat cerebellum granule cells.
