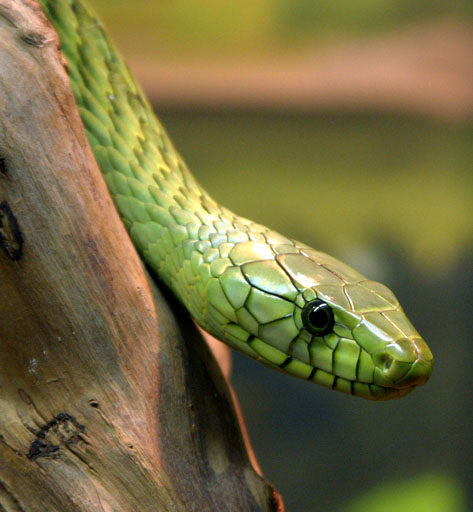

Conservation status
- Least Concern (IUCN 3.1)

Scientific classification
- Kingdom: Animalia
- Phylum: Chordata
- Class: Reptilia
- Order: Squamata
- Suborder: Serpentes
- Family: Elapidae
- Subfamily: Elapinae
- Genus: Dendroaspis
- Species: D. viridis

Binomial name
- Dendroaspis viridis (Hallowell, 1844)
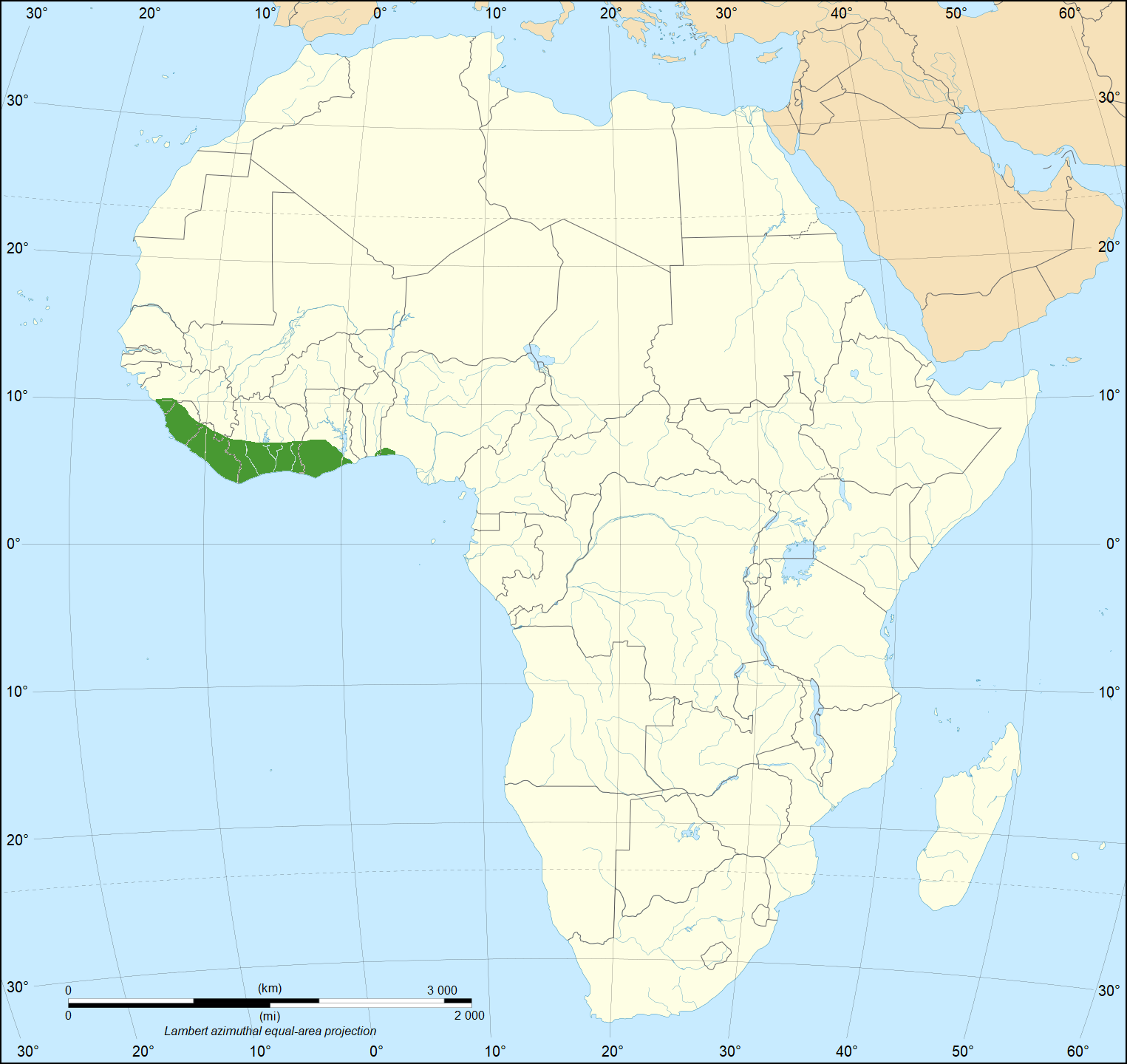
- Dendroaspis viridis range

Synonyms
- Leptophis viridis Hallowell, 1844; Dinophis hammondii Hallowell, 1852; Dendroaspis viridis hallowelli Yeomans, 1993; Dendroaspis viridis hallowelli – Barnett & Emms, 2005

= Western green mamba =

Species of snake

The western green mamba (Dendroaspis viridis) is a long, thin, and highly venomous snake species of the mamba genus, Dendroaspis. This species was first described in 1844 by American herpetologist Edward Hallowell. The western green mamba is a fairly large and predominantly arboreal species, capable of navigating through trees swiftly and gracefully. It will also descend to ground level to pursue prey such as rodents and other small mammals.

The western green mamba is a shy and agile snake that lives mainly in the coastal tropical rainforest, thicket, and woodland regions of western Africa. Its venom is a highly potent mixture of rapid-acting presynaptic and postsynaptic neurotoxins (dendrotoxins), cardiotoxins and fasciculins. Some consider this species not to be a particularly aggressive snake, but others have suggested that they are extremely nervous and are prone to attack aggressively when cornered. Conflict with humans is low compared to some other species found in the region. Bites to people by this species are quite uncommon. Their mortality rate, however, is high; many of the recorded bites have been fatal. Rapid progression of severe, life-threatening symptoms are hallmarks of mamba bites. Bites with envenomation can be rapidly fatal.

== Taxonomy ==
The western green mamba was first described by the American herpetologist and physician Edward Hallowell in 1844 as Leptophis viridis, from a specimen collected in Liberia. The specific name viridis is the Latin adjective "green". In 1852, Hallowell described Dinophis hammondii from two specimens of western green mambas collected in Liberia, naming it for his friend Ogden Hammond of South Carolina. These were later deemed the same species by Belgian-British zoologist George Albert Boulenger.

The genus was misspelt as Dendraspis by Dumeril in 1856, and generally uncorrected by subsequent authors. In 1936, Dutch herpetologist Leo Brongersma pointed the correct spelling was Dendroaspis. Analysis of the components of the venom of all mambas places the western green mamba as sister species to Jameson's mamba. In addition to being called the western green mamba, this species is also commonly known as the West African green mamba, and formerly Hallowell's green mamba.

Analysis of the components of the venom of all mambas places the western green mamba sister to Jameson's mamba (Dendroapsis j. jamesoni and j. kaimosae), as shown in the cladogram below.

- - - Ophiophagus hannah
  - - - - Dendroaspis j. jamesoni
        - Dendroaspis j. kaimosae
      - Dendroaspis viridis
    - - Dendroaspis angusticeps
      - Dendroaspis polylepis

== Description ==
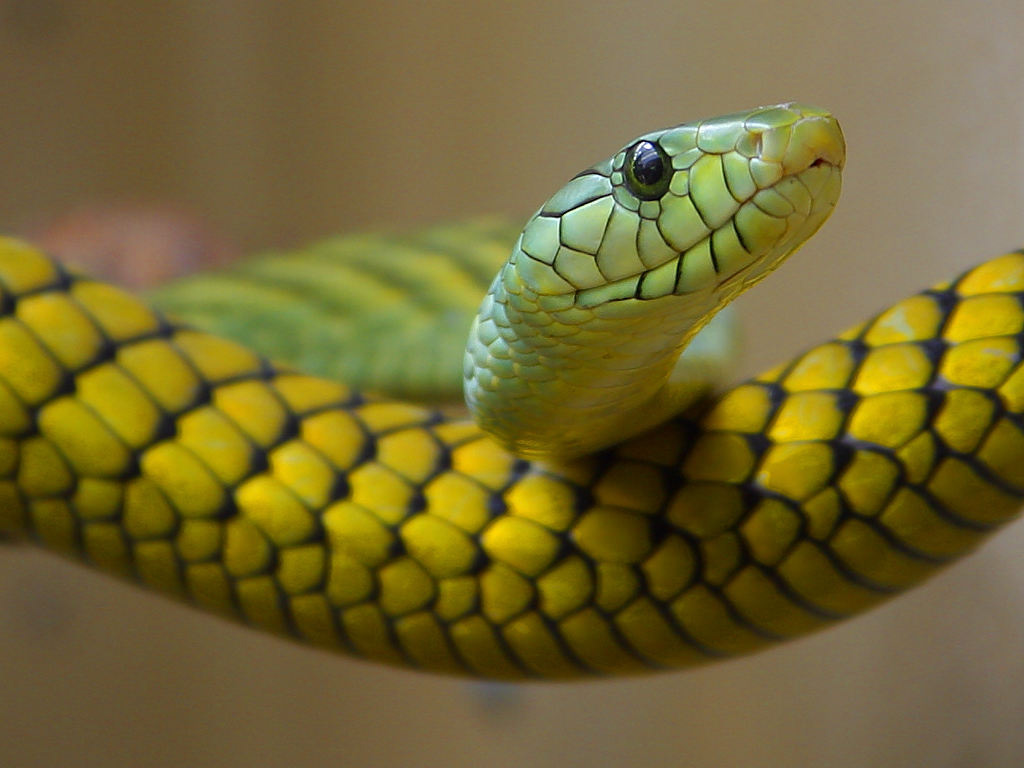

The western green mamba has a long and slender body with a long tapering tail. The average length of an adult is between 1.4 metres (4.6 ft) and 2.1 metres (7 ft), with large approaching 2.4 metres (8 ft) long. The long thin head has a distinct canthus above the medium-sized eyes, which have round pupils and yellowish brown irises. When threatened or otherwise aroused, the western green mamba is capable of flattening its neck area into a slight hood. The snake is bright green fading to yellow or orange towards the tail. Its scales have prominent black margins, giving the species a networked pattern.

The western green mamba can be mistaken for similar species such as green bushsnakes of the genus Philothamnus or the boomslang (Dispholidus typus).

=== Scalation ===
The number and pattern of scales on a snake's body are a key element of identification to species level. The western green mamba has 13 rows of long and thin dorsal scales at midbody, fewer than any similar species. Each is double the length of the ventral scales. There are 211 to 225 ventral scales, 105 to 128 divided subcaudal scales, and a divided anal scale. (Note: A divided scale is one split down the midline into two scales.) Its mouth is lined with 7 to 9 supralabial scales above, the fourth and sometimes fifth one located under the eye, and 9–10 sublabial scales below.

== Distribution and habitat ==
The western green mamba is native to West Africa from Gambia and southern Senegal to Benin, including the intervening countries (from west to east) Guinea-Bissau, Guinea, Sierra Leone, Liberia, Côte d'Ivoire (Ivory Coast), Ghana, and Togo. It is common in Togo, found as far north as the Alédjo Wildlife Reserve, though may theoretically be found in Sarakawa and Djamdé forests in the Kara Region. Records from Nigeria are dubious, and reports from the Central African Republic are more likely to be misidentification of Jameson's mamba.

Western green mambas live mainly in the coastal tropical rainforest, thicket, and woodland regions of western Africa. The majority of records of the western green mamba are from within the continuous forest, but the Gambia and Guinea-Bissau records are from isolated forests. The species persists in areas where the tree cover has been removed, providing that sufficient hedges and thicket remain. Found in some suitably vegetated suburbs and towns and parklands therein. It is largely confined to areas where rainfall exceeds 1,500 millimetres (60 in). In Togo, however, its range extends into the drier open forests of the north, the Guinean savannas of the west, and the littoral zone.

=== Conservation status ===
This species is classified as Least Concern (LC) on the IUCN Red List of Threatened Species (v3.1, 2011). The conservation status of this species was last assessed in July 2012 and published in 2013, and it was classed as such due to a wide distribution, fairly generalist habits, stable population and the lack of major threats. However, its habitat and population is highly fragmented. Despite not being listed in the Convention on International Trade in Endangered Species of Wild Fauna and Flora (CITES), the western green mamba is collected and sold internationally, and is one of the more expensive African snake species.

== Behaviour and ecology ==
Mostly diurnal, the western green mamba spends most of its time in the forest canopy, at times at considerable height, though on occasion commonly go to the ground. When it wants to sleep it seeks out tree branches that offer dense cover. It generally retreats if encountered. The oldest recorded western green mamba was a captive specimen that lived 18.7 years.

== Breeding ==
The species lays a clutch of 6 to 14 eggs.

=== Diet and predators ===
The western green mamba generally hunts in trees though can also hunt on the ground. It preys on birds and small mammals, including rodents and squirrels.

== Venom ==
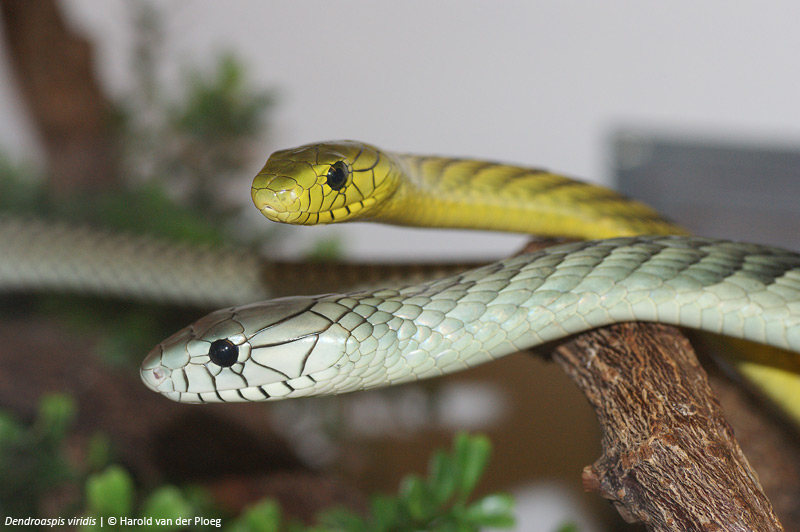

The western green mamba is classified as a snake of medical importance in western SubSaharan Africa by the World Health Organization, (Note: Snakes of Medical Importance include those with highly dangerous venom resulting in high rates of morbidity and mortality, or those that are common agents in snakebite.) although bites from this species are rare as it is rarely encountered. When bitten, symptoms rapidly begin to manifest, usually within the first 15 minutes or less. The extraordinary speed with which the venom spreads through tissue and produces rapid manifestations of life-threatening symptoms is unique to mambas. Common symptoms of a bite from a western green mamba include local pain and swelling, although uncommon, local necrosis can be moderate, ataxia, headache, drowsiness, difficulty breathing, vertigo, hypotension (low blood pressure), diarrhea, dizziness, and paralysis. Left untreated, new and more severe symptoms rapidly progress. All symptoms worsen and the victim eventually dies due to suffocation resulting from paralysis of the respiratory muscles. Bites with envenomation can be rapidly fatal, which can be possible in 30 minutes.

Similar to the venom of most other mambas, the western green mamba's contains predominantly three-finger toxin agents. The exception is the black mamba, whose venom lacks the potent alpha-neurotoxin as well. It is thought this may reflect the species' preferred prey—small mammals for the mainly land-dwelling black mamba, versus birds for the other predominantly arboreal mambas. Unlike that of many snake species, the venom of mambas has little phospholipase A2. Overall, the venom of the western green mamba is more potent than that of the eastern green mamba, similar or slightly less potent than that of Jameson's mamba, and much less potent than that of the black mamba.

The venom consists mainly of both pre-synaptic and post-synaptic neurotoxins, cardiotoxins, and fasciculins. The toxicity of the venom can vary tremendously depending on various factors including diet, geographical location, age-dependent change, and other factors. The SC and IV LD_{50} for this species is 0.79 mg/kg and 0.71 mg/kg, respectively (Christensen and Anderson (1967)). One study determined the LD_{50} of the venom administered to mice via the intraperitoneal (IP) route was 0.33 mg/kg. In another test using mice that were administered the western green mamba's venom via the intraperitoneal (IP) route the LD_{50} was 0.045 mg/kg. Another experimental IV LD_{50} toxicity of 0.5 mg/kg has been reported, with an average wet venom yield of 100 mg. Like other mamba species, western green mamba venom is among the most rapid-acting venom of snakes.

=== Treatment ===
The speed of onset of envenomation means that urgent medical attention is needed. Standard first aid treatment for any bite from a suspected venomous snake is the application of a pressure bandage, minimisation of the victim's movement, and rapid conveyance to a hospital or clinic. Due to the neurotoxic nature of green mamba venom, an arterial tourniquet may be beneficial. Tetanus toxoid is sometimes administered, though the main treatment is the administration of the appropriate antivenom.
