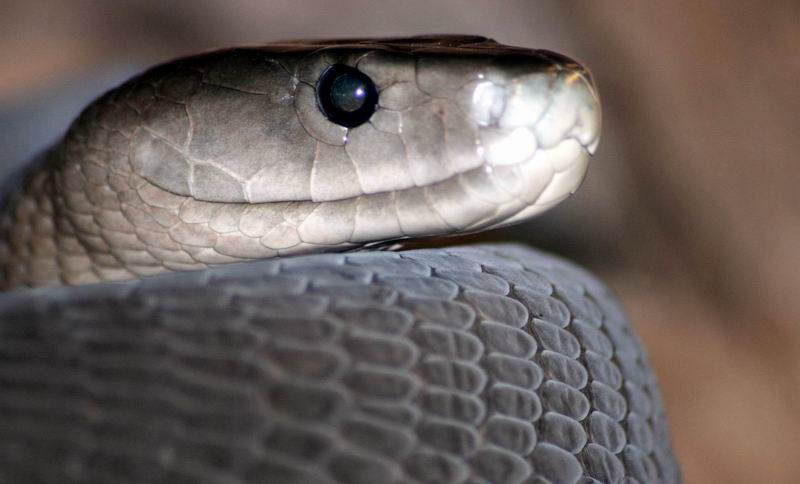
- Black mamba (D. polylepis)

Scientific classification
- Kingdom: Animalia
- Phylum: Chordata
- Class: Reptilia
- Order: Squamata
- Suborder: Serpentes
- Family: Elapidae
- Subfamily: Elapinae
- Genus: Dendroaspis; Schlegel, 1848

Species
- Dendroaspis angusticeps; Dendroaspis jamesoni; Dendroaspis polylepis; Dendroaspis viridis

= Mamba =

Genus of venomous snakes

Mambas are fast-moving, highly venomous snakes of the genus Dendroaspis (which literally means "tree asp") in the family Elapidae. Four extant species are recognized; three of which are essentially arboreal and green in colour, whereas the black mamba (D. polylepis), is largely terrestrial and generally brown or grey in colour. All are native to various regions in sub-Saharan Africa, and all are feared throughout their ranges, especially the black mamba.

== Taxonomy ==
The genus was first described by German naturalist Hermann Schlegel in 1848, with Elaps jamesonii as the type species. It was misspelt as Dendraspis by Dumeril in 1856, and generally uncorrected by subsequent authors. In 1936, Dutch herpetologist Leo Brongersma pointed out that the correct spelling was Dendroaspis, but added that the name was invalid, as Fitzinger had coined Dendraspis in 1843 for the king cobra, so had priority. In 1962, German herpetologist Robert Mertens, though, proposed that the 1843 description of Dendraspis by Fitzinger be suppressed due to its similarity to Dendroaspis, and the confusion it would cause by its use.

=== Etymology ===
Dendroaspis is derived from Ancient Greek déndron (δένδρον), meaning "tree", and aspis (ασπίς), which is understood to mean "shield", but also denotes "cobra" or simply "snake", in particular "snake with hood (shield)". Via Latin aspis, it is the source of the English word "asp". In ancient texts, aspis or asp often referred to the Egyptian cobra (Naja haje), in reference to its shield-like hood.

=== Phylogeny ===
A 2018 analysis of the venom of the mambas, as well as a 2016 genetic analysis, found the following cladogram representative of the relationship between the species.

- - - Ophiophagus hannah
  - - - - D. j. jamesoni
        - D. j. kaimosae
      - D. viridis
    - - D. angusticeps
      - D. polylepis

=== Species ===
Image	Species (Note: A binomial authority in parentheses indicates that the species was originally described in a genus other than Dendroaspis.)	Common name	Subsp.*	Geographic range
	Dendroaspis angusticeps (Smith, 1849)	Eastern green mamba	0	Eastern and Southern Africa: Kenya, Tanzania, Malawi, Mozambique, Zimbabwe, Eswatini, eastern South Africa
	Dendroaspis jamesoni^{T} (Traill, 1843)	Jameson's mamba	2	Central Africa: South Sudan, Gabon, Angola, Zambia, Republic of the Congo, Democratic Republic of the Congo, Cameroon, Equatorial Guinea, Nigeria, Kenya, Uganda, Rwanda, Burundi, Tanzania, Central African Republic, Benin, Togo, Ghana
	Dendroaspis polylepis Günther, 1864	Black mamba	0	Central, Eastern, and Southern Africa: Cameroon, northern Republic of the Congo, Central African Republic, northeast Democratic Republic of the Congo, and southwestern Sudan to Ethiopia, Eritrea, Djibouti, Somalia, Kenya, eastern Uganda, Rwanda, Burundi, Tanzania, southwards to Mozambique, Eswatini, Malawi, Zambia, Zimbabwe, Lesotho, and Botswana to KwaZulu-Natal in South Africa, and Namibia; then northeasterly through Angola to the southeastern part of the Democratic Republic of Congo
	Dendroaspis viridis (Hallowell, 1844)	Western green mamba	0	Western Africa: southern Senegal, Gambia, Guinea-Bissau, Guinea, Sierra Leone, Liberia, Côte d'Ivoire, Ghana, Togo, Benin, and southwest Nigeria

* Including the nominate subspecies.
^{T} Type species.

== Biology ==
The three green species of mambas are arboreal, whereas the black mamba is largely terrestrial. All four species are active diurnal hunters, preying on birds, lizards, and small mammals. At nightfall, some species, especially the terrestrial black mamba, shelter in a lair. A mamba may retain the same lair for years. Resembling a cobra, the threat display of a mamba includes rearing, opening the mouth, and hissing. The black mamba's mouth is black within, which renders the threat more conspicuous. A rearing mamba has a narrower yet longer hood and tends to lean well forward, instead of standing erect as a cobra does.

Stories of black mambas that chase and attack humans are common, but they generally avoid contact with humans. Black mambas (D. polylepis) are highly venomous snakes native to parts of sub-Saharan Africa; they are fast-moving, nervous snakes that strike when threatened. Their venom has neurotoxins and cardiotoxins that rapidly induce symptoms of dizziness, extreme fatigue, vision problems, foaming at the mouth, paralysis, convulsions, and eventual death from respiratory or cardiac failure if untreated. Although black mamba venom is highly toxic, antivenom is available and can treat envenomation promptly.

Most apparent cases of pursuit are likely examples of witnesses mistaking the snake's attempt to retreat to its lair when a human happens to be in the way. Black mambas usually use speed to escape from threats, and humans are their main predators, rather than prey.

Black mambas live in the savannas and rocky hills of southern and eastern Africa. They are Africa's longest venomous snake, reaching up to 14 feet in length, although the average is closer to 8.2 feet. They are also among the fastest snakes in the world, slithering at speeds up to 12.5 miles per hour.

== Venom ==
All mambas have medically significant venom, with dendrotoxins, short-chain alpha-neurotoxins, cardiotoxins, and fasciculins. All mambas are classified as snakes of medical importance by the World Health Organization. (Note: Snakes of medical importance include those with highly dangerous venom resulting in high rates of morbidity and mortality, or those that are common agents in snakebite.)

The multiple components in dendrotoxins have different targets:

- Dendrotoxin 1 inhibits the K^{+} channels at the pre- and post-synaptic level in the intestinal smooth muscle. It also inhibits Ca^{2+}-sensitive K^{+} channels from rat skeletal muscle‚ incorporated into planar bilayers (Kd = 90 nM in 50 mM KCl).)
- Dendrotoxin 3 inhibits acetylcholine M4 receptors.
- Dendrotoxin 7, commonly referred to as muscarinic toxin 7 (MT7), inhibits acetylcholine M1 receptors.
- Dendrotoxin K is structurally homologous to Kunitz-type proteinase inhibitors with activity as a selective blocker of voltage-gated potassium channels.

Toxicity alone does not determine severity of envenomation; other factors include the snake's temperament, venom yields, proximity of wounds to the central nervous system, and depth of punctures. Bites by all members of this genus are capable of causing rapid onsets of symptoms, but the black mamba bite has the worst prognosis, possibly as a result of its more terrestrial nature (having more potential for human contact), high defensiveness (having a higher possibility to deliver fatal bites instead of dry bites), large size (giving it a higher strike position proximal to the victim's brain), and higher average venom yields and potential toxicity (based on experimental results). A lethality rate of near 100% for untreated black mamba bites has been circulating between various sources, which is probably based on a single medical record made in a single district between 1957 and 1963, when specific antivenom had yet to be introduced. Seven of seven victims of this species who received nonspecific polyvalent antivenom that had no effect on the species' toxins succumbed to its bites. However, another snakebite survey in South Africa reported a death rate around 43% among those who received ineffective treatments (15 fatal cases out of 35 patients). A mamba-specific antivenom was introduced in 1962, followed by a fully polyvalent antivenom in 1971; over this period, five of 38 people in South Africa bitten by black mambas who received the antivenom died, according to the same report. Since then, the number has significantly dropped with the widespread use of specific antivenom.

Despite their fearsome reputation and often exaggerated notoriety, mambas' envenomation occurs far less frequently than some other snakes', for instance the puff adder. Besides proximity to residences, behaviour of a given species is also a critical aspect win snakebite morbidities. Mambas are agile, usually fleeing from any confrontation with unambiguous threat display, which allows early recognition of the serpent, avoiding escalation in tension.
