= Fasciculin =

Class of toxins found in some snake venoms

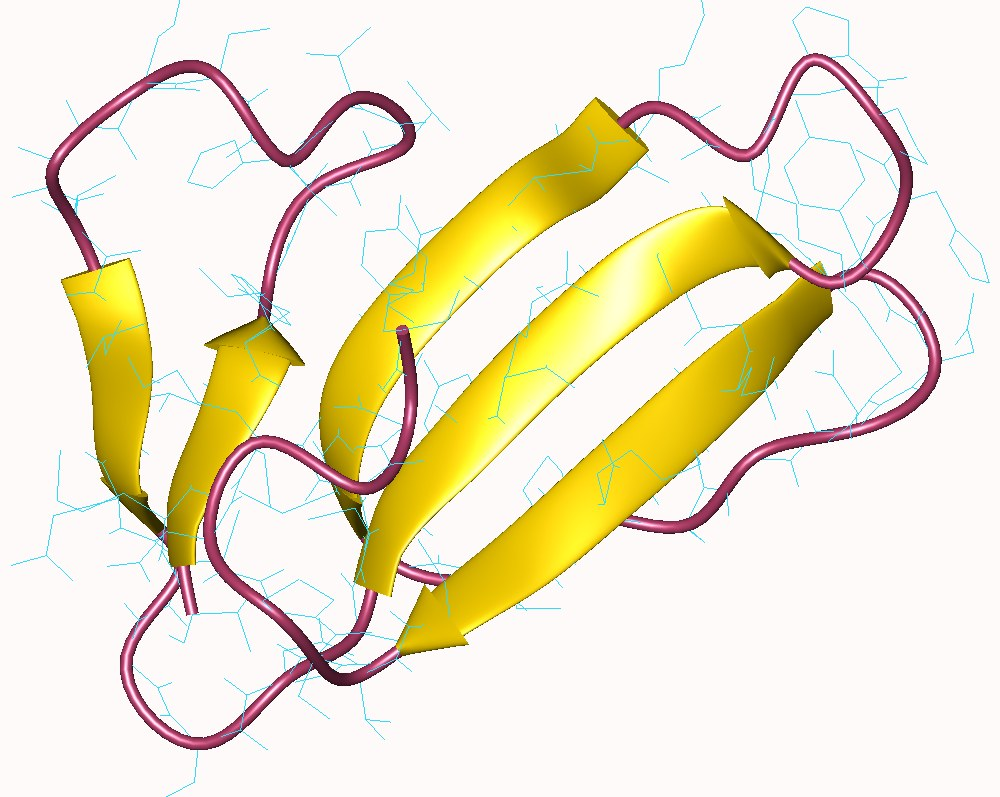
Fasciculin 1, Dendroaspis angusticeps (green mamba).

Fasciculins are a class of toxic proteins found in certain snake venoms, notably some species of mamba. Investigations have revealed distinct forms in some green mamba venoms, in particular FAS1 and FAS2 Fasciculins are so called because they cause intense fasciculation in muscle fascicles of susceptible organisms, such as the preferred prey of the snakes. This effect helps to incapacitate the muscles, either killing the prey, or paralysing it so that the snake can swallow it.

== Fundamental mechanism of action ==
The mechanism of action of FAS proteins is associated with attachment to molecules within muscular acetylcholinesterase, and at neuromuscular junctions, thus conferring their ability to interfere with neuromodulatory inhibition.

== Molecular nature and physiological effect ==
Fasciculins from mambas inhibit mammalian and fish acetylcholinesterases intensely, but are less active against the corresponding enzymes in insects, reptiles and birds. As one might expect of fast-acting venoms, they are fairly small proteins of 61 amino acid residues. Their three-dimensional shape is three-fingered, and is secured by four cross-linking disulfide bridges.

== Disruption of acetylcholine signalling ==
Venom disrupters of acetylcholine neurotransmission generally penetrate the neuromuscular junction, where they interfere with either the production or reception of acetylcholine, or the hydrolysis of acetylcholine after it has achieved its function of neurotransmission; mamba fasciculins prevent the final stage of this process by binding to acetylcholinesterase and blocking its action on acetylcholine; the result is that after the acetylcholine has transmitted the required stimulus, it continues with the stimulus after it has become inappropriate. That mechanism is in some ways similar to the effect of the so-called organophosphate nerve agents; the blockage of the acetylcholinesterase action is what causes the fasciculation that inspired the name fasciculin.

== Docking and activity ==
In mammalian acetylcholinesterase two conserved peripheral anionic residues form part of the enzyme where the FAS molecule docks. Insect and avian acetylcholinesterases lack the two residues in those positions, and that drastically reduces their affinity for mamba fasciculins. However, there is a significant, though reduced, toxic effect, because several basic residues in the venom protein still establish and maintain contacts with the enzyme. This is unusual in protein complementarity, in that it involves attractions between multiple charged residues, but without any salt linkage between the molecules.
