= Asp (snake) =

Venomous snake found in the Nile region

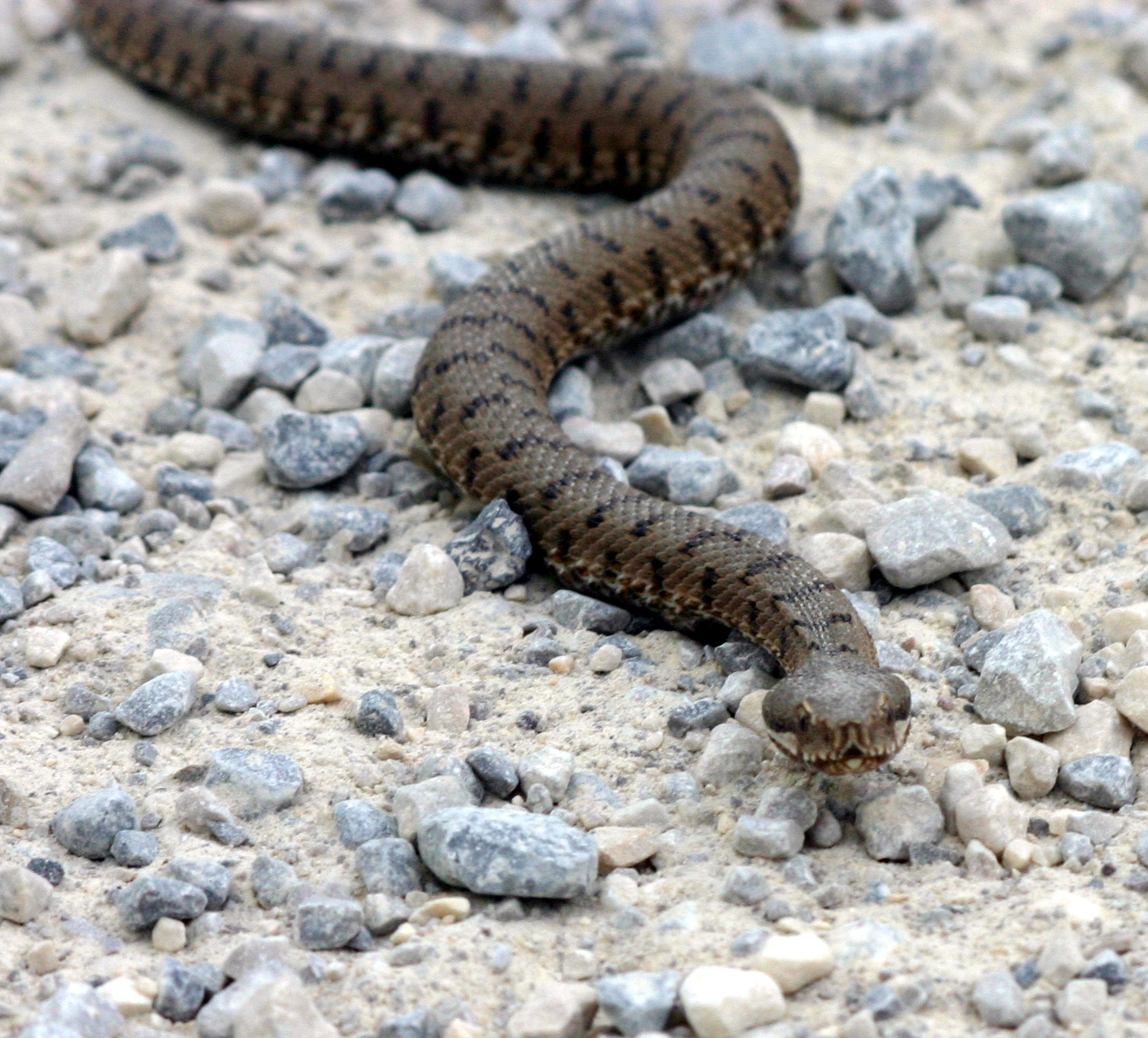
European asp, Vipera aspis

Asp is the modern anglicisation of the word "aspis", which in antiquity referred to any one of several venomous snake species found in the Nile region. The specific epithet, aspis, is a Greek word that means "viper". It is believed that aspis referred to what is now known as the Egyptian cobra.

== Historical representation ==
Throughout dynastic and Roman Egypt, the asp was a symbol of royalty. Moreover, in both Egypt and Greece, its potent venom made it useful as a means of execution for criminals who were thought deserving of a more dignified death than that of typical executions.

In some stories of Perseus, after killing Medusa, the hero used winged sandals to transport her head to King Polydectes. As he was flying over Egypt, some of her blood fell to the ground, which spawned asps and amphisbaena.

According to Plutarch, the Egyptian queen Cleopatra, in preparing for her own suicide, tested various deadly poisons on condemned people and concluded that the bite of the asp (from the Greek word aspis, usually meaning an Egyptian cobra in Ptolemaic Egypt, and not the European asp) was the least terrible way to die; the venom brought sleepiness and heaviness without spasms of pain. Some believe it to have been a horned viper, though in 2010, German historian Christoph Schaefer and toxicologist Dietrich Mebs, after extensive study into the event, came to the conclusion that rather than enticing a venomous animal to bite her, Cleopatra actually used a mixture of hemlock, wolfsbane, and opium to end her life.

Nonetheless, the image of suicide-by-asp has become inextricably connected with Cleopatra, as immortalized by William Shakespeare:

With thy sharp teeth this knot intrinsicate
Of life at once untie: poor venomous fool
Be angry, and dispatch.

—Cleopatra, Act V, scene II
Antony and Cleopatra

Othello also famously compares his hatred for Desdemona as being full of "aspics' tongues" in Act 3, Scene III of Shakespeare's play Othello.

== Legend ==
The hypnalis is a legendary creature described in medieval bestiaries. It is described as a type of asp that kills its victim in their sleep. "Cleopatra placed it on herself (at her breasts) and thus was freed by death as if by sleep."

== See also ==
- Serpent (symbolism)
- Snakebite
- Vipera aspis
