= Dendrotoxin =

Chemical compound

Dendrotoxins are a class of presynaptic neurotoxins produced by mamba snakes (Dendroaspis) that block particular subtypes of voltage-gated potassium channels in neurons, thereby enhancing the release of acetylcholine at neuromuscular junctions. Because of their high potency and selectivity for potassium channels, dendrotoxins have proven to be extremely useful as pharmacological tools for studying the structure and function of these ion channel proteins.

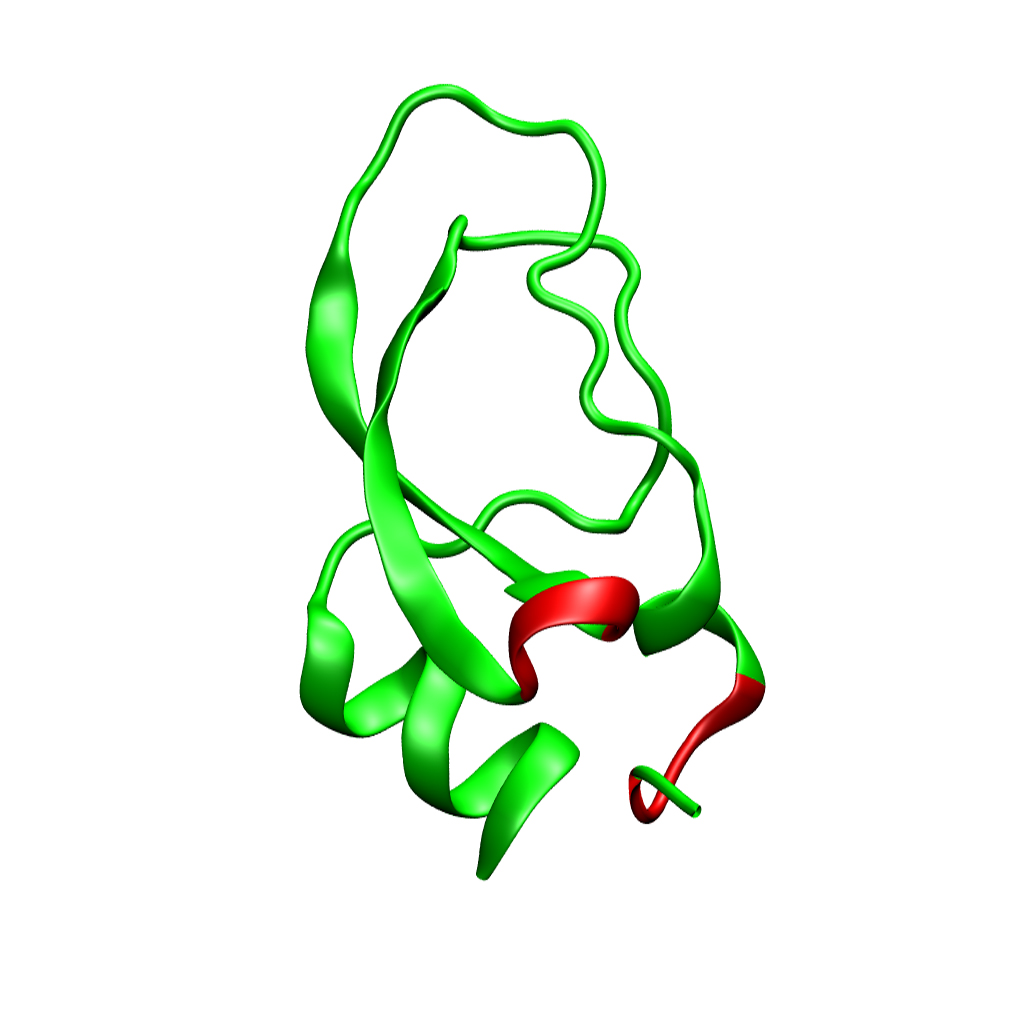
3D model of α-dendrotoxin. colored in red are positively charged amino acid residues in the N-terminus and the β-turn region that are believed to be important for potassium channel binding.

Dendrotoxins have been shown to block particular subtypes of voltage-gated potassium (K^{+}) channels in neuronal tissue. In the nervous system, voltage-gated K^{+} channels control the excitability of nerves and muscles by controlling the resting membrane potential and by repolarizing the membrane during action potentials. Dendrotoxin has been shown to bind the nodes of Ranvier of motor neurons and to block the activity of these potassium channels. In this way, dendrotoxins prolong the duration of action potentials and increase acetylcholine release at the neuromuscular junction, which may result in muscle hyperexcitability and convulsive symptoms.

== Dendrotoxin structure ==
Dendrotoxins are ~7 kDa proteins consisting of a single peptide chain of approximately 57–60 amino acids. Several homologues of α-dendrotoxin (α-DTX) have been isolated, all possessing a slightly different sequence. However, the molecular architecture and folding conformation of these proteins are all very similar. Dendrotoxins possess a very short 3_{10}-helix near the N-terminus of the peptide, while a two turn α-helix occurs near the C-terminus. A two-stranded antiparallel β-sheet occupies the central part of the molecular structure. These two β-strands are connected by a distorted β-turn region that is thought to be important for the binding activity of the protein. All dendrotoxins are cross-linked by three disulfide bridges, which add stability to the protein and greatly contribute to its structural conformation. The cysteine residues forming these disulfide bonds have been conserved among all members of the dendrotoxin family, and are located at C7-C57, C16-C40, and C32-C53 (numbering according to α-DTX).

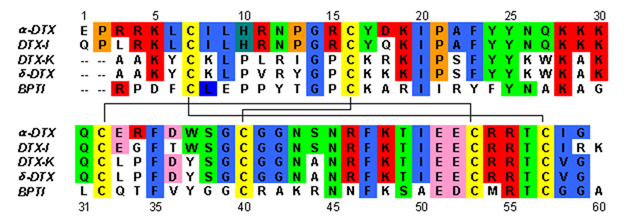
Sequence alignment of dendrotoxins and BPTI. Amino acid residues with similar properties are colored accordingly.

The dendrotoxins are structurally homologous to the Kunitz-type serine protease inhibitors, including bovine pancreatic trypsin inhibitor (BPTI). Alpha-dendrotoxin and BPTI have been shown to have 35% sequence identity as well as identical disulfide bonds. Despite the structural homology between these two proteins, dendrotoxins do not appear to exhibit any measurable inhibitory protease activity like BPTI. This loss of activity appears to result from the absence of key amino acid residues that produce structural differences that hinder the key interactions necessary for the protease activity seen in BPTI.

Dendrotoxins are basic proteins that possess a net positive charge when present in neutral pH. Most of the positively charged amino acid residues of dendrotoxins are located in the lower part of the structure, creating a cationic domain on one side of the protein. Positive charge results from lysine (Lys) and arginine (Arg) residues that are concentrated in three primary regions of the protein: near the N-terminus (Arg3, Arg4, Lys5), near the C-terminus (Arg54, Arg55) and at the narrow β-turn region (Lys28, Lys29, Lys30). It is believed that these positively charged residues can play a critical role in dendrotoxin binding activity, as they can make potential interactions with the anionic sites (negatively charged amino acids) in the pore of potassium channels.

== Biological activity ==
=== Pharmacology ===
A single dendrotoxin molecule associates reversibly with a potassium channel in order to exert its inhibitory effect. It is proposed that this interaction is mediated by electrostatic interactions between the positively charged amino acid residues in the cationic domain of dendrotoxin and the negatively charged residues in the ion channel pore. Potassium channels, similar to other cation-selective channels, are believed to have a cloud of negative charges that precede the opening to the channel pore that help conduct potassium ions through the permeation pathway. It is generally believed (though not proven) that dendrotoxin molecules bind to anionic sites near the extracellular surface of the channel and physically occlude the pore, thereby preventing ion conductance. However, Imredy and MacKinnon have proposed that δ-dendrotoxin may have an off-center binding site on their target proteins, and may inhibit the channel by altering the structure of the channel, rather than physically blocking the pore.

=== Biologically important residues ===
Many studies have attempted to identify which amino acid residues are important for binding activity of dendrotoxins to their potassium channel targets. Harvey et al. used residue-specific modifications to identify positively charged residues that were crucial to the blocking activity of dendrotoxin-I (DTX-I). They reported that acetylation of Lys5 near the N-terminal region and Lys29 in the β-turn region led to substantial decreases in DTX-I binding affinity. Similar results have been shown with dendrotoxin-K using site-directed mutagenesis to substitute positively charged lysine and arginine residues to neutral alanines. These results, along with many others, have implicated that the positively charged lysines in the N-terminal half, particularly Lys5 in the 3_{10}-helix, play a very important role in the dendrotoxin binding to their potassium channel targets. The lysine residues in the β-turn region has provided more confounding results, appearing to be biologically critical in some dendrotoxin homologues and not necessary for others. Furthermore, mutation of the entire lysine triplet (K28-K29-K30) to Ala-Ala-Gly in α-DTX resulted in very little change in biological activity.

There is a general agreement that the conserved lysine residue near the N-terminus (Lys5 in α-DTX) is crucial for the biological activity of all dendrotoxins, while additional residues, such as those in the beta-turn region, might play a role in dendrotoxin specificity by mediating the interactions of individual toxins to their individual target sites. This not only helps explain the stringent specificity of some dendrotoxins for different subtypes of voltage-gated K^{+} channels, but also accounts for differences in the potency of dendrotoxins for common K^{+} channels. For example, Wang et al. showed that the interaction of dendrotoxin-K with K_{V}1.1 is mediated by its lysine residues in both the N-terminus and the β-turn region, while α-DTX appears to interact with its target solely through the N-terminus. This less expansive interactive domain may help explain why α-DTX is less discriminative while dendrotoxin-K is strictly selective for K_{V}1.1.

== Uses in research ==
Potassium channels of vertebrate neurons display a high degree of diversity that allows neurons to precisely tune their electrical signaling properties by expression of different combinations of potassium channel subunits. Furthermore, because they regulate ionic flux across biological membranes, they are important in many aspects of cellular regulation and signal transduction of different cell types. Therefore, voltage-gated potassium channels are targets for a wide range of potent biological toxins from such organisms as snakes, scorpions, sea anemones, and cone snails. Thus, venom purification has led to the isolation of peptide toxins such as the dendrotoxins, which have become useful pharmacological tools for the study of potassium channels. Because of their potency and selectivity for different subtypes of potassium channels, dendrotoxins have become useful as molecular probes for the structural and functional study of these proteins. This may help improve our understanding of the roles played by individual channel types, as well as assist in the pharmacological classification of these diverse channel types. Furthermore, the availability of radiolabelled dendrotoxins provides a tool for the screening of other sources in a search for new potassium channel toxins, such as the kalicludine class of potassium channel toxins in sea anemones. Lastly, the structural information provided by dendrotoxins may provide clues to the synthesis of therapeutic compounds that may target particular classes of potassium channels. Dendrotoxin I has also been used to help purify and characterize the K+ channel protein to which it binds via different binding assay and chromatography techniques.
