= Barry Rumack =

American medical toxicologist and pediatrician

M.D. Barry H. Rumack
- Born: November 1, 1942 (age 83); Chicago, Illinois
- Citizenship: United States

Academic background
- Education: University of Wisconsin School of Medicine and Public Health (MD, 1968)

Academic work
- Discipline: Pediatrics, Medical toxicology
- Sub-discipline: Clinical toxicology
- Notable ideas: Poisindex (1973), Rumack–Matthew nomogram (1975)

Barry H. Rumack (born November 1, 1942) is an American medical toxicologist and pediatrician. His primary clinical and research interest has been in clinical toxicology with a special interest in acetaminophen poisoning. Since 2014 he is emeritus professor of emergency medicine and pediatrics at the University of Colorado School of Medicine.

== Early years and education ==
Rumack was born in Chicago, Illinois, on November 1, 1942. He grew up in Whitefish Bay, Wisconsin, and graduated from Whitefish Bay High School in 1960. In 1964, he graduated from the University of Chicago with a Bachelor of Science in microbiology in 1964.

In 1968, Rumack completed medical school at the University of Wisconsin School of Medicine and Public Health, where he received his M.D. He was a clinical research fellow at the National Institutes of Health, National Cancer Institute, Baltimore Cancer Center in the section of neurosurgery and a research fellow with Jordan Holtzman, MD, PhD in the Section of Pharmacology.

In 1971 he returned to the University of Colorado to complete a pediatric residency and then did a fellowship at the University of Colorado School of Medicine in clinical pharmacology and toxicology. During the second half of 1973 he was clinical fellow with Dr. Henry Matthew MD at the Royal Infirmary of Edinburgh in Edinburgh, Scotland. He developed a significant interest in acetaminophen and along with Professor Matthew collected 34 cases of overdose and combined them with 30 previously published cases in creation of a nomogram relating blood level to time of ingestion. That was then published in 1975 and is used worldwide in the assessment of acetaminophen overdose treatment as Rumack–Matthew nomogram.

== Academic career ==
In January 1973, Rumack joined the faculty of the University of Colorado School of Medicine as assistant professor of pediatrics. He has been with the university ever since and was named emeritus professor of emergency medicine and pediatrics in 2014.

In 1973, Rumack developed Poisindex, one of the first commercial databases, which could retrieve diagnosis and treatment data for a vast variety of poisonous substances. Published first on microfiche and later on CD-ROM it became the standard software used by the majority of poison control centers in the US and globally.

In January 1974, he became the director of the Rocky Mountain Poison and Drug Center (now Denver Health Medical Center) and served in this role until his retirement in 1992. His early work at the center was focused on developing a regional resource for poison information and treatment. Part of that work involved the development of Poisindex. Within that system an international mushroom toxicology classification system was developed. Similar systems for plants and snakes were also incorporated. Having such technical advantage, Rumack established a hotline at the Rocky Mountain Poison & Drug Center Rumack, where every poison enquiry could be answered within 30 to 50 seconds. The Kansas City Star 1978 feature story noted that the center "has become a technical prototype for similar operations around the country".

In 1973, he and co-authors published a paper examining hepatic drug metabolism and malnutrition. This paper was based on extensive work with monkeys who were also assessed for cognitive and other functions in separate publications and forms the metabolic basis for the understanding of the importance of correcting malnutrition during early brain development. This work is utilized today as part of the basis for the United Nations emergency feeding programs.

In 1976, along with co-authors he published a paper regarding unrecognizable salicylate intoxication which revealed numerous missed cases of aspirin poisoning in patients who were thought to have metabolic acidosis of unknown origin. In September 1976, he began a protocol and was the principal investigator of the use of n-acetylcysteine for the treatment of acetaminophen overdose as part of a National Multiclinic Study which collected and published the largest series of acetaminophen cases ever collected in The New England Journal of Medicine in 1988. This treatment, now given intravenously, has been the standard approach to this overdose to this day worldwide.

In 1978, together with Emanuel Salzman Rumack co-authored Mushroom Poisoning:diagnosis and treatment, which had a second edition in 1994 with David Spoerke as a co-author. In 1980, he was portrayed in the movie Airplane! (1980) as Dr. Rumack (played by Leslie Nielsen), who took care of passengers on the plane with food poisoning. In 2008, in a testimony at court he explained that he used to live in Milwaukee next door to filmmakers David and Jerry Zucker and they took his name for the movie role.

In May 1989, Rumack visited Georgia as part of a three experts team commissioned by Physicians for Human Rights to investigate a possible use of toxic gas during the April 9 tragedy. He was able to identify the gas as chloropicrin, which is an illegal war gas, utilizing a mass spectrometer at the Tbilisi State Medical University.

In 1999, he was doing a sabbatical at the Food and Drug Administration when he was asked to evaluate safe levels for exposure to methylmercury in pediatric vaccines. Rumack developed a pharmacokinetic model to analyze the amount of mercury to which infants were being exposed and found that mercury levels at Thiomersal-containing vaccines were far exceeding safety guidelines established by United States Environmental Protection Agency, Food and Drug Administration and Agency for Toxic Substances and Disease Registry. Unfortunately, the Food and Drug Administration did not share this information with the public.

Rumack has continued with academic work at the University of Colorado School of Medicine both teaching and doing research. His most recent publications were focused on the use of fomepizole as a treatment for delayed and massive ingestions of acetaminophen (Akakpo 2019, Kang et al. 2019, Adkakpo et al. 2020.). He also co-edited a definitive textbook on the subject of acetaminophen toxicity with Hartmut Jaeschke, PhD, ATS, FAASLD, and Mitchell R. McGill, PhD, NRCC, FADLM in 2024.

== Selected publications ==
- Bateman DN, Dart RC, Dear JW, Prescott LF, Rumack BH. Fifty years of paracetamol (acetaminophen) poisoning: the development of risk assessment and treatment 1973-2023 with particular focus on contributions published from Edinburgh and Denver. Clinical Toxicology (Philadelphia). 2023 December;61(12): pages 1020-1031. doi: 10.1080/15563650.2023.2293452. Epub 2024 January 25. PMID 38197864.
- Akakpo JY, Ramachandran A, Rumack BH, Wallace DP, Jaeschke H. Lack of mitochondrial Cyp2E1 drives acetaminophen-induced ER stress-mediated apoptosis in mouse and human kidneys: Inhibition by 4-methylpyrazole but not N-acetylcysteine. Toxicology. 2023 December;500:153692. doi: 10.1016/j.tox.2023.153692. Epub 2023 November 30. PMID 38042273.
- Rumack, Barry H.; Holtzman, Jordan; Chase, Peter H. (1973). "Hepatic drug metabolism and protein malnutrition". Journal of Pharmacology and Experimental Therapeutics. 186 (3): 441–446. doi:10.1016/S0022-3565(25)29614-8. PMID 4199525.
- Rumack, Barry H.; Matthew, H. (1975). "Acetaminophen poisoning and toxicity". Pediatrics. 55 (6): 871–876. doi:10.1542/peds.55.6.871. PMID 1134886. S2CID 45739342.
- Rumack, Barry H.; Peterson, Robert C.; Koch, Gary G. (February 23, 1981). "Acetaminophen Overdose: 662 Cases With Evaluation of Oral Acetylcysteine Treatment". JAMA Internal Medicine. 141 (3): 380–385. doi:10.1001/archinte.1981.00340030112020. PMID 7469629.
- Smilkstein, Martin J.; Knapp, Gary L.; Kulig, Kenneth W.; Rumack, Barry H. (December 15, 1988). "Efficacy of Oral N-Acetylcysteine in the Treatment of Acetaminophen Overdose". The New England Journal of Medicine. 319 (24): 1557–1562. doi:10.1056/NEJM198812153192401. PMID 3059186.
- Rumack, Barry H. (April 29, 2002). "Acetaminophen Hepatotoxicity: The First 35 Years". Clinical Toxicology. 40 (1): 3–20. doi:10.1081/CLT-120002882. PMID 11990202. S2CID 30209690.
- Bronstein, Alvin C.; Spyker, Daniel A.; Cantilena Jr., Louis R.; Rumack, Barry H.; Dart, Richard C. (2012). "2011 Annual Report of the American Association of Poison Control Centers' National Poison Data System (NPDS): 29th Annual Report". Clinical Toxicology. 50 (10): 911–1164. doi:10.3109/15563650.2012.746424. PMID 23272763. S2CID 46707712.

== Selected books ==
- Rumack, Barry H.; Salzman, Emanuel (1978). Mushroom Poisoning:diagnosis and treatment. CRC Press. ISBN 9780849351853.
- Bayer, Marc J.; Rumack, Barry H., eds. (1983). Poisoning & overdose. Aspen Systems Corp. ISBN 9780894438097.
- Bayer, Marc J.; Rumack, Barry H.; Wanke, Lee A., eds. (1984). Toxicologic emergencies. R.J. Brady Co. ISBN 9780893031886.
- Spoerke, David G.; Rumack, Barry H., eds. (1994). Handbook of mushroom poisoning : diagnosis and treatment. CRC Press. ISBN 9780849301940.

== Awards and recognition ==
Rumack received three highest American career achievement awards in the field of clinical toxicology: an Annual Recognition Award from the American Association of Poison Control Centers (1985), Matthew J. Ellenhorn Award from the American College of Medical Toxicology (2001) and the Career Achievement Award from the American Academy of Clinical Toxicology (2011). His work was also recognized by the Clinton Thienes, M.D., Award from the American Academy of Clinical Toxicology (1991) and by Honorary Doctorate from the Jagiellonian University (1995). Prince Mahidol Award 2023 in Bangkok Thailand https://www.princemahidolaward.org/the-presentation-ceremony-of-prince-mahidol-award-2023/ https://www.bangkokpost.com/thailand/general/2730049/royal-honours-for-medical-innovators
