= Gamma-glutamylcyclotransferase =

Class of enzymes

gamma-glutamylcyclotransferase

Identifiers
- EC no.: 2.3.2.4
- CAS no.: 9045-44-7

Databases
- BRENDA: enzyme data
- ExPASy: NiceZyme view
- KEGG: enzyme entry
- MetaCyc: metabolic pathway
- Rhea: reactions
- PDB structures: RCSB PDB PDBe PDBsum
- Gene Ontology: AmiGO / QuickGO
Search
- PMC: articles
- PubMed: articles
- NCBI: proteins

In enzymology, a gamma-glutamylcyclotransferase (EC 2.3.2.4) is an enzyme that catalyzes the chemical reaction

(5-L-glutamyl)-L-amino acid $\rightleftharpoons$ 5-oxoproline + L-amino acid

Hence, this enzyme has one substrate, (5-L-glutamyl)-L-amino acid, and two products, 5-oxoproline and L-amino acid.

This enzyme belongs to the family of transferases, specifically the aminoacyltransferases. The systematic name of this enzyme class is (5-L-glutamyl)-L-amino-acid 5-glutamyltransferase (cyclizing). Other names in common use include gamma-glutamyl-amino acid cyclotransferase, gamma-L-glutamylcyclotransferase, and L-glutamic cyclase. This enzyme participates in glutathione metabolism.

== Structural studies ==
As of late 2007, two structures have been solved for this class of enzymes, with PDB accession codes PDB: 2PN7 and PDB: 2RBH.
