= Aspartyltransferase =

Identifiers
- EC no.: 2.3.2.7
- CAS no.: 37257-23-1

Databases
- IntEnz: IntEnz view
- BRENDA: BRENDA entry
- ExPASy: NiceZyme view
- KEGG: KEGG entry
- MetaCyc: metabolic pathway
- PRIAM: profile
- PDB structures: RCSB PDB PDBe PDBsum
- Gene Ontology: AmiGO / QuickGO
Search
- PMC: articles
- PubMed: articles
- NCBI: proteins

Aspartyltransferase (EC 2.3.2.7) is an enzyme that catalyzes the chemical reaction

L-asparagine
+ NH_{2}OH
β-L-aspartylhydroxamic acid
+ NH_{3}

The two substrates of this enzyme characterised from Mycobacterium tuberculosis are L-asparagine and hydroxylamine, which are converted to the hydroxamate, β-L-aspartylhydroxamic acid and ammonia.

This enzyme belongs to the family of transferases, specifically the aminoacyltransferases. The systematic name of this enzyme class is L-asparagine:hydroxylamine gamma-aspartyltransferase. Other names in common use include beta-aspartyl transferase, and aspartotransferase.
