= Glutathione gamma-glutamylcysteinyltransferase =

glutathione gamma-glutamylcysteinyltransferase

Identifiers
- EC no.: 2.3.2.15
- CAS no.: 125390-02-5

Databases
- IntEnz: IntEnz view
- BRENDA: BRENDA entry
- ExPASy: NiceZyme view
- KEGG: KEGG entry
- MetaCyc: metabolic pathway
- PRIAM: profile
- PDB structures: RCSB PDB PDBe PDBsum
- Gene Ontology: AmiGO / QuickGO
Search
- PMC: articles
- PubMed: articles
- NCBI: proteins

In enzymology, a glutathione gamma-glutamylcysteinyltransferase (EC 2.3.2.15) is an enzyme that catalyzes the chemical reaction

glutathione + [Glu(-Cys)]n-Gly $\rightleftharpoons$ Gly + [Glu(-Cys)]n^{+}1-Gly

Thus, the two substrates of this enzyme are glutathione and [Glu(-Cys)]n-Gly, whereas its two products are Gly and [Glu(-Cys)]n+1-Gly.

This enzyme belongs to the family of transferases, specifically the aminoacyltransferases. The systematic name of this enzyme class is glutathione:poly(4-glutamyl-cysteinyl)glycine 4-glutamylcysteinyltransferase. Other names in common use include phytochelatin synthase, and gamma-glutamylcysteine dipeptidyl transpeptidase.

== Structural studies ==
As of late 2007, two structures have been solved for this class of enzymes, with PDB accession codes 2BTW and 2BU3.
