= Lysyltransferase =

lysyltransferase

Identifiers
- EC no.: 2.3.2.3
- CAS no.: 37257-20-8

Databases
- IntEnz: IntEnz view
- BRENDA: BRENDA entry
- ExPASy: NiceZyme view
- KEGG: KEGG entry
- MetaCyc: metabolic pathway
- PRIAM: profile
- PDB structures: RCSB PDB PDBe PDBsum
- Gene Ontology: AmiGO / QuickGO
Search
- PMC: articles
- PubMed: articles
- NCBI: proteins

In enzymology, a lysyltransferase (EC 2.3.2.3) is an enzyme that catalyzes the chemical reaction

L-lysyl-tRNA + phosphatidylglycerol $\rightleftharpoons$ tRNA + 3-phosphatidyl-1'-(3'-O-L-lysyl)glycerol

Thus, the two substrates of this enzyme are L-lysyl-tRNA and phosphatidylglycerol, whereas its two products are tRNA and 3-phosphatidyl-1'-(3'-O-L-lysyl)glycerol.

This enzyme belongs to the family of transferases, specifically the aminoacyltransferases. The systematic name of this enzyme class is L-lysyl-tRNA:phosphatidylglycerol 3-O-lysyltransferase.
