= D-alanine gamma-glutamyltransferase =

Identifiers
- EC no.: 2.3.2.14
- CAS no.: 9046-27-9

Databases
- IntEnz: IntEnz view
- BRENDA: BRENDA entry
- ExPASy: NiceZyme view
- KEGG: KEGG entry
- MetaCyc: metabolic pathway
- PRIAM: profile
- PDB structures: RCSB PDB PDBe PDBsum
- Gene Ontology: AmiGO / QuickGO
Search
- PMC: articles
- PubMed: articles
- NCBI: proteins

D-alanine gamma-glutamyltransferase (EC 2.3.2.14) is an enzyme that catalyzes the chemical reaction

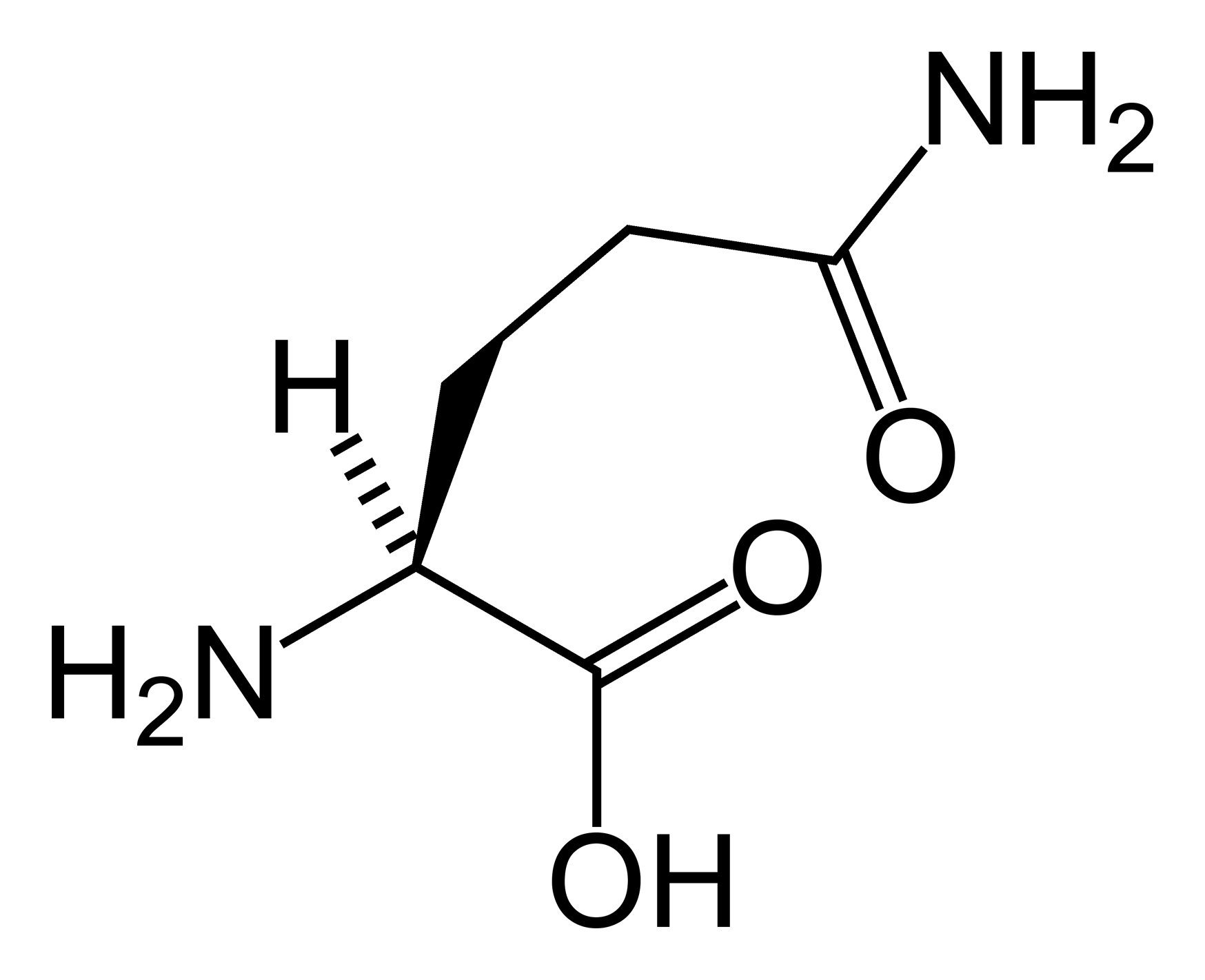
glutamine
+
D-alanine
NH_{3}
L-γ-glutamyl-D-alanine

The two substrates of this enzyme characterised from pea seedlings are L-glutamine and D-alanine, which are combined to form the dipeptide, L-γ-glutamyl-D-alanine, with loss of ammonia.

This enzyme belongs to the family of transferases, specifically the aminoacyltransferases. The systematic name of this enzyme class is L-glutamine:D-alanine gamma-glutamyltransferase.
