= Alanylphosphatidylglycerol synthase =

Class of enzymes

alanylphosphatidylglycerol synthase

Identifiers
- EC no.: 2.3.2.11
- CAS no.: 37257-27-5

Databases
- IntEnz: IntEnz view
- BRENDA: BRENDA entry
- ExPASy: NiceZyme view
- KEGG: KEGG entry
- MetaCyc: metabolic pathway
- PRIAM: profile
- PDB structures: RCSB PDB PDBe PDBsum
- Gene Ontology: AmiGO / QuickGO
Search
- PMC: articles
- PubMed: articles
- NCBI: proteins

In enzymology, an alanylphosphatidylglycerol synthase (EC 2.3.2.11) is an enzyme that catalyzes the chemical reaction

L-alanyl-tRNA + phosphatidylglycerol $\rightleftharpoons$ tRNA + 3-O-L-alanyl-1-O-phosphatidylglycerol

Thus, the two substrates of this enzyme are L-alanyl-tRNA and phosphatidylglycerol, whereas its two products are tRNA and 3-O-L-alanyl-1-O-phosphatidylglycerol.

This enzyme belongs to the family of transferases, specifically the aminoacyltransferases. The systematic name of this enzyme class is L-alanyl-tRNA:phosphatidylglycerol alanyltransferase. Other names in common use include O-alanylphosphatidylglycerol synthase, and alanyl phosphatidylglycerol synthetase.
