= QPCT =

Protein-coding gene in the species Homo sapiens

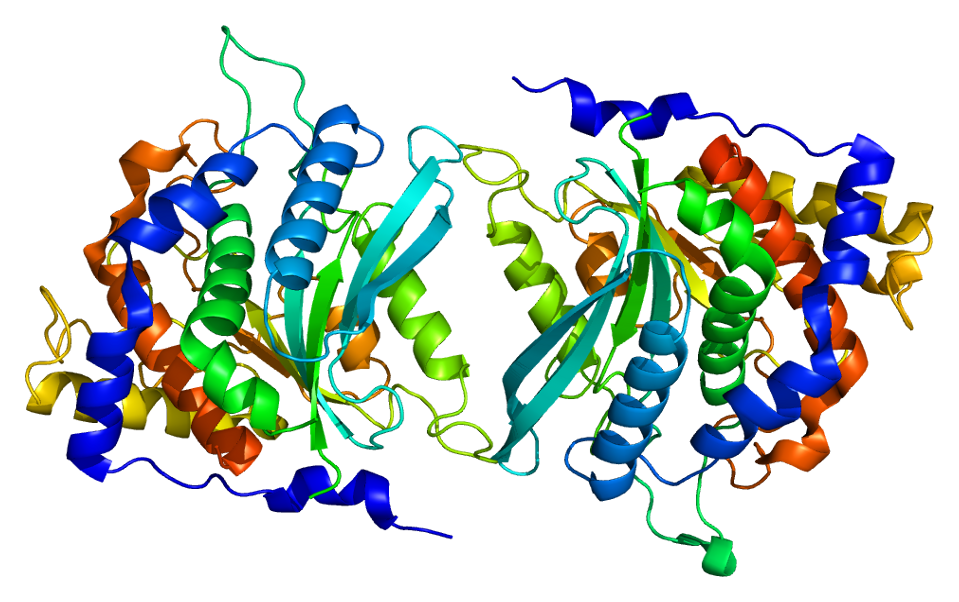

Identifiers
- Aliases: QPCT, GCT, QC, sQC, glutaminyl-peptide cyclotransferase
- External IDs: OMIM: 607065; MGI: 1917786; GeneCards: QPCT
Available structures
PDB	Ortholog search: PDBe RCSB
PDB	List of PDB id codes 2ZEE, 2ZEF, 2AFU, 2AFM, 2AFX, 4YU9, 2ZEL, 2ZEG, 2ZEM, 4YWY, 2AFZ, 3PBB, 2ZEH, 2AFS, 3SI0, 2ZEP, 3PBE, 2ZEO, 2ZED, 2AFO, 2ZEN, 2AFW
Enzyme activity
EC #	BRENDA	ExPASy	KEGG	MetaCyc
2.3.2.5	↗	↗	↗	↗

Gene location (Human)
Chr.	Chromosome 2 (human)
Band	2p22.2	Start	37,342,827 bp
Band	2p22.2	End	37,373,322 bp

Gene location (Mouse)
Chr.	Chromosome 17 (mouse)
Band	17|17 E3	Start	79,359,335 bp
Band	17|17 E3	End	79,397,807 bp
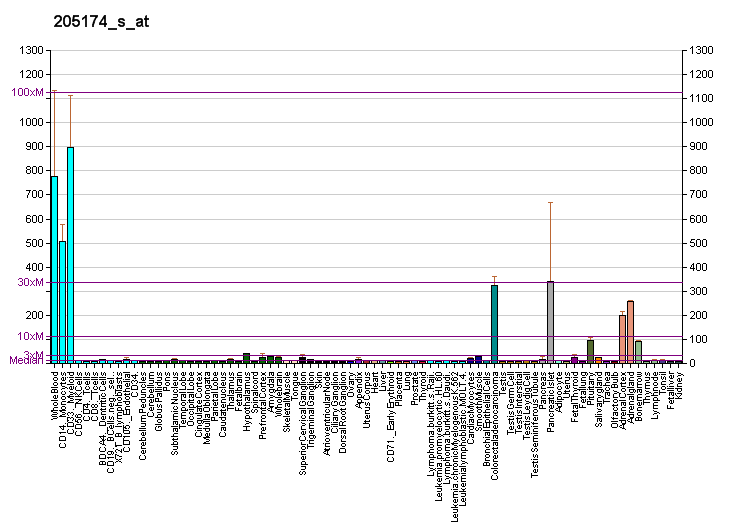
RNA expression pattern
Bgee	Human / Mouse (ortholog); Top expressed in: right adrenal cortex; beta cell; left adrenal gland; left adrenal cortex; blood; bone marrow cell; monocyte; skin of arm; trabecular bone; corpus epididymis / Top expressed in: spermatocyte; lens; lumbar subsegment of spinal cord; iris; neural layer of retina; arcuate nucleus; paraventricular nucleus of hypothalamus; spermatid; seminiferous tubule; median eminence; More reference expression data
BioGPS	More reference expression data
Gene ontology
Molecular function	transferase activity; zinc ion binding; glutaminyl-peptide cyclotransferase activity; acyltransferase activity; metal ion binding
Cellular component	extracellular exosome; extracellular region; specific granule lumen; tertiary granule lumen; ficolin-1-rich granule lumen
Biological process	peptidyl-pyroglutamic acid biosynthetic process, using glutaminyl-peptide cyclotransferase; neutrophil degranulation
Sources:Amigo / QuickGO
Orthologs
Databases	NCBI: entry; OMA: entry
Species	Human	Mouse
Entrez	25797	70536
Ensembl	ENSG00000115828	ENSMUSG00000024084
UniProt	Q16769	Q9CYK2
RefSeq (mRNA)	NM_012413	NM_027455; NM_001316729
RefSeq (protein)	NP_036545	NP_001303658; NP_081731
Location (UCSC)	Chr 2: 37.34 – 37.37 Mb	Chr 17: 79.36 – 79.4 Mb
PubMed search
- Wikidata
View/Edit Human	View/Edit Mouse

Glutaminyl-peptide cyclotransferase is an enzyme that in humans is encoded by the QPCT gene.

This gene encodes human pituitary glutaminyl cyclase, which is responsible for the presence of pyroglutamyl residues in many neuroendocrine peptides. The amino acid sequence of this enzyme is 86% identical to that of bovine glutaminyl cyclase.
