= UDP-N-acetylmuramoylpentapeptide-lysine N6-alanyltransferase =

Class of enzymes

Identifiers
- EC no.: 2.3.2.10
- CAS no.: 37257-26-4

Databases
- BRENDA: enzyme data
- ExPASy: NiceZyme view
- KEGG: enzyme entry
- MetaCyc: metabolic pathway
- Rhea: reactions
- PDB structures: RCSB PDB PDBe PDBsum
- Gene Ontology: AmiGO / QuickGO
Search
- PMC: articles
- PubMed: articles
- NCBI: proteins

In enzymology, an UDP-N-acetylmuramoylpentapeptide-lysine N6-alanyltransferase (EC 2.3.2.10) is an enzyme that catalyzes the chemical reaction

It was named following the Enzyme Commission number by the IUBMB nomenclature committee

L-alanyl-tRNA + UDP-N-acetylmuramoyl-L-alanyl-D-glutamyl-L-lysyl-D-alanyl-D-alanine $\rightleftharpoons$ tRNA + UDP-N-acetylmuramoyl-L-alanyl-D-glutamyl-N_{6}-(L-alanyl)-L-lysyl-D- alanyl-D-alanine

Thus, the two substrates of this enzyme are L-alanyl-tRNA and UDP-N-acetylmuramoyl-L-alanyl-D-glutamyl-L-lysyl-D-alanyl-D-alanine, whereas its 3 products are tRNA, UDP-N-acetylmuramoyl-L-alanyl-D-glutamyl-N6-(L-alanyl)-L-lysyl-D-, and alanyl-D-alanine.

This enzyme belongs to the family of transferases, specifically the aminoacyltransferases. The systematic name of this enzyme class is L-alanyl-tRNA:UDP-N-acetylmuramoyl-L-alanyl-D-glutamyl-L-lysyl-D-ala nyl-D-alanine N6-alanyltransferase. Other names in common use include alanyl-transfer ribonucleate-uridine, diphosphoacetylmuramoylpentapeptide transferase, UDP-N-acetylmuramoylpentapeptide lysine N6-alanyltransferase, uridine diphosphoacetylmuramoylpentapeptide lysine, N6-alanyltransferase, L-alanyl-tRNA:UDP-N-acetylmuramoyl-L-alanyl-D-glutamyl-L-lysyl-D-, and alanyl-D-alanine 6-N-alanyltransferase. This enzyme participates in peptidoglycan biosynthesis.

== Structural studies ==
As of late 2007, 4 structures have been solved for this class of enzymes, with PDB accession codes PDB: 1P4N, PDB: 1XE4, PDB: 1XF8, and PDB: 1XIX.
