= Leucyltransferase =

leucyltransferase

Identifiers
- EC no.: 2.3.2.6
- CAS no.: 37257-22-0

Databases
- IntEnz: IntEnz view
- BRENDA: BRENDA entry
- ExPASy: NiceZyme view
- KEGG: KEGG entry
- MetaCyc: metabolic pathway
- PRIAM: profile
- PDB structures: RCSB PDB PDBe PDBsum
- Gene Ontology: AmiGO / QuickGO
Search
- PMC: articles
- PubMed: articles
- NCBI: proteins

In enzymology, a leucyltransferase (EC 2.3.2.6) is an enzyme that catalyzes the chemical reaction

L-leucyl-tRNA + protein $\rightleftharpoons$ tRNA + L-leucyl-protein

Thus, the two substrates of this enzyme are L-leucyl-tRNA and protein, whereas its two products are tRNA and L-leucyl-protein.

This enzyme belongs to the family of transferases, specifically the aminoacyltransferases. The systematic name of this enzyme class is L-leucyl-tRNA:protein leucyltransferase. Other names in common use include leucyl, phenylalanine-tRNA-protein transferase, leucyl-phenylalanine-transfer ribonucleate-protein, aminoacyltransferase, and leucyl-phenylalanine-transfer ribonucleate-protein transferase.

== Structural studies ==
As of late 2007, three structures have been solved for this class of enzymes, with PDB accession codes 2CXA, 2DPS, and 2DPT.
