= Pyr =

Pyr may refer to:

- Pyr (Encantadia), a character in the Encantadia franchise
- Pyr (publisher)
- Pyridine
- Pyridoxine, vitamin B6
- Pyrrolidonyl-β-naphthylamide, used in microbiology to distinguish certain Streptococcal organisms
- Pyruvic acid
- Saint Pyr
  - Caldey Island, called "Ynys Pyr" in Welsh
- Andravida airbase (IATA: PYR)
