= L-Arginine L-pyroglutamate =

l-Arginine l-pyroglutamate
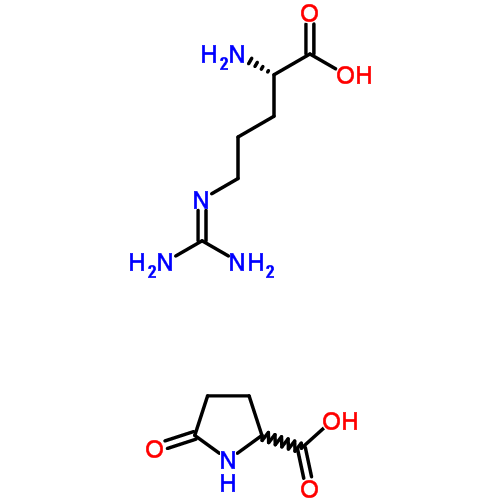
Arginine Pyroglutamate
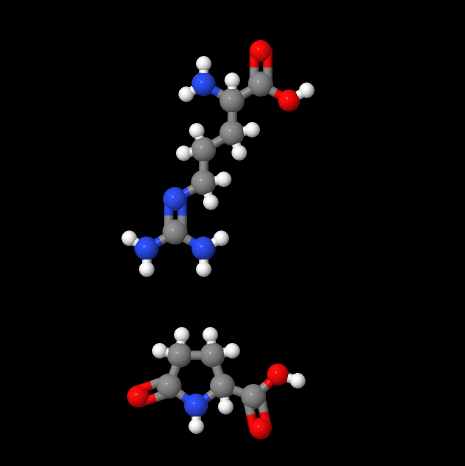
Arginine Pyroglutamate

Names
- IUPAC name (2S)-2-amino-5-(diaminomethylideneamino)pentanoic acid; (2S)-5-oxopyrrolidine-2-carboxylic acid (1:1)

Identifiers
CAS Number	56265-06-6
3D model (JSmol)	Interactive image
ChemSpider	4957262
ECHA InfoCard	100.054.601
EC Number	260-081-5
PubChem CID	198346
UNII	808T94CEU6
CompTox Dashboard (EPA)	DTXSID50971695
- InChI: InChI=1/C6H14N4O2.C5H7NO3/c7-4(5(11)12)2-1-3-10-6(8)9;7-4-2-1-3(6-4)5(8)9/h4H,1-3,7H2,(H,11,12)(H4,8,9,10);3H,1-2H2,(H,6,7)(H,8,9)/t4-;/m0./s1 Key: UYCAGRPOUWSBIQ-WCCKRBBIBE
- SMILES: O=C(O)C1NC(=O)CC1.O=C(O)[C@@H](N)CCC/N=C(\N)N

Properties
Chemical formula	C_{11}H_{21}N_{5}O_{5}
Molar mass	303.319 g·mol^{−1}
Appearance	white powder
Density	solid
Melting point	210 °C (410 °F; 483 K)
Solubility in water	soluble

Hazards
Flash point	201.2 °C (394.2 °F; 474.3 K)
- Except where otherwise noted, data are given for materials in their standard state (at 25 °C [77 °F], 100 kPa). Infobox references

l-Arginine l-pyroglutamate, also known as pirglutargine and arginine pidolate, is the l-arginine salt of pyroglutamic acid. Arginine pyroglutamate is a delivery form of arginine.

== Physical and chemical properties ==
l-Arginine l-pyroglutamate is a crystalline solid powder with a sour taste. It is soluble in cold water.

== Hazards ==
The compound is hazardous if ingested or inhaled in concentrated form. It is slightly hazardous in case of skin and eye contact.
