= Pyroglutamyl-peptidase I =

Identifiers
- EC no.: 3.4.19.3
- CAS no.: 9075-21-2

Databases
- BRENDA: enzyme data
- ExPASy: NiceZyme view
- KEGG: enzyme entry
- MetaCyc: metabolic pathway
- Rhea: reactions
- PDB structures: RCSB PDB PDBe PDBsum
Search
- PMC: articles
- PubMed: articles
- NCBI: proteins

Pyroglutamyl-peptidase I (EC 3.4.19.3, also known as Pyrrolidonyl peptidase, is an enzyme (a cysteine peptidase) found in bacteria, plants and animals.

It can be used to distinguish certain Streptococcal organisms.

Other names are 5-oxoprolyl-peptidase, pyrase, pyrrolidonyl arylamidase, pyroglutamate aminopeptidase, pyroglutamyl aminopeptidase, L-pyroglutamyl peptide hydrolase, pyrrolidone-carboxyl peptidase, pyrrolidone-carboxylate peptidase, pyrrolidonyl peptidase, L-pyrrolidonecarboxylate peptidase, pyroglutamidase, pyrrolidonecarboxylyl peptidase) is an enzyme. This enzyme catalyses the following chemical reaction

Release of an N-terminal pyroglutamyl group from a polypeptide, the second amino acid generally not being Pro

== Human gene ==
PGPEP1

== See also ==
- Pyrrolidonyl-beta-naphthylamide
- P-Dimethylaminocinnamaldehyde
- Pyroglutamic acid
- 2-Naphthylamine
