= Gamma-L-glutamyl-butirosin B gamma-glutamyl cyclotransferase =

γ-L-glutamyl-butirosin B gamma-glutamyl cyclotransferase

Identifiers
- EC no.: 4.3.2.6

Databases
- IntEnz: IntEnz view
- BRENDA: BRENDA entry
- ExPASy: NiceZyme view
- KEGG: KEGG entry
- MetaCyc: metabolic pathway
- PRIAM: profile
- PDB structures: RCSB PDB PDBe PDBsum
Search
- PMC: articles
- PubMed: articles
- NCBI: proteins

γ-L-Glutamyl-butirosin B γ-glutamyl cyclotransferase (EC 4.3.2.6, btrG (gene)) is an enzyme with systematic name γ-L-glutamyl-butirosin B γ-glutamyl cyclotransferase (5-oxo-L-proline producing). This enzyme catalyses the following chemical reaction

γ-L-glutamyl-butirosin B $\rightleftharpoons$ butirosin B + 5-oxo-L-proline

The enzyme catalyses the last step in the biosynthesis of the aminoglycoside antibiotic butirosin B.
