= Glutaminyl-peptide cyclotransferase =

glutaminyl-peptide cyclotransferase

Identifiers
- EC no.: 2.3.2.5
- CAS no.: 37257-21-9

Databases
- IntEnz: IntEnz view
- BRENDA: BRENDA entry
- ExPASy: NiceZyme view
- KEGG: KEGG entry
- MetaCyc: metabolic pathway
- PRIAM: profile
- PDB structures: RCSB PDB PDBe PDBsum
- Gene Ontology: AmiGO / QuickGO
Search
- PMC: articles
- PubMed: articles
- NCBI: proteins

In enzymology, a glutaminyl-peptide cyclotransferase (EC 2.3.2.5) is an enzyme that catalyzes the chemical reaction

L-glutaminyl-peptide $\rightleftharpoons$ 5-oxoprolyl-peptide + NH_{3} or
L-glutamyl-peptide $\rightleftharpoons$ 5-oxoprolyl-peptide + H_{2}O

Hence, this enzyme has one substrate, L-glutaminyl-peptide or L-glutamyl-peptide, and two products, 5-oxoprolyl-peptide and NH_{3} or H_{2}O. The N-terminal 5-oxoproline residue on the peptide is also commonly known as pyroglutamic acid.

This enzyme belongs to the family of transferases, specifically the aminoacyltransferases. The systematic name of this enzyme class is L-glutaminyl-peptide gamma-glutamyltransferase (cyclizing). Other names in common use include glutaminyl-tRNA cyclotransferase, glutaminyl cyclase, and glutaminyl-transfer ribonucleate cyclotransferase.

== Structural studies ==
As of late 2007, 8 structures have been solved for this class of enzymes, with PDB accession codes 2AFM, 2AFO, 2AFS, 2AFU, 2AFW, 2AFX, 2AFZ, and 2IWA.

== Human gene ==
QPCT - note that Q is one-letter abbreviation for glutamine, and glutaminyl is the name of the acyl group.
