= AtSCE1 =

Enzyme

Identifiers
- Organism: Arabidopsis thaliana
- Symbol: SCE1
- PDB: 6gv3
- UniProt: Q42551

Other data
- EC number: 2.3.2.23
Search for
- Structures: Swiss-model
- Domains: InterPro

Arabidopsis SUMO-conjugation enzyme (AtSCE1) is an enzyme that is a member of the small ubiquitin-like modifier (SUMO) post-translational modification pathway. This process, and the SCE1 enzyme with it, is highly conserved across eukaryotes yet absent in prokaryotes. In short, this pathway results in the attachment of a small polypeptide through an isopeptide bond between modifying enzyme and the ε-amino group of a lysine residue in the substrate. In plants, the 160 amino acid SCE1 enzyme was first characterized in 2003. One functional gene copy, SCE1a, was found on chromosomes 3.

== Discovery ==
The post-translational modification of proteins plays a crucial part in the function of biological processes. These modifications were originally thought to be limited to the addition of small molecules, such as sugars or phosphate, but in the late 1990's, small polypeptide tags were discovered to also modify proteins. Ubiquitin, a 76-amino acid polypeptide, was among the first of these tags to be studied, and to date many polypeptide tags are compared to this standard. In 1995, the first SUMO polypeptide was identified in Saccharomyces cerevisiae SMT3, and soon after the first conjugating enzyme was identified in the same organism, though it was originally thought to process ubiquitin. SUMO peptides share several key characteristics with ubiquitin, despite the fact that they only have 8-15% sequence homology. Both fold into a similarly shaped globular structure with an exposed glycine-tipped tail used in ligation with the target. Also similar to ubiquitin, SUMO peptides must be modified by proteases to expose this glycine once the cell is ready to use it. While ubiquitin tags its targets for degradation, SUMO proteins appear to have more diverse roles in cells, primarily focused around stress responses.

Within a few years, SUMO peptides and the enzyme pathways that attach them had been identified in several eukaryotic model systems, including Drosophila, mice, and humans. In 2003, Richard D. Vierstra and colleagues first confirmed the presence of a functional SUMOylation pathway in Arabidopsis thaliana through Blast searches and subsequent immunological assays. They found 8 functional SUMO genes in addition to copies of SUMO enzymes E1, E2, and E3. They found two copies of the E2 enzymes in the A. thaliana genome, AtSCE1a on chromosome 3 and AtSCE1b on chromosome 5. AtSCE1b was missing 55 bases, and since transcripts and predicted proteins were absent, it is assumed that this was a pseudogene. In the same study, the group ran immunoblot analyses to test if the stress response driven changes seen in SUMO populations of other organisms would happen in A. thaliana as well. In response to heat stress, within 30 minutes SUMO1/2 conjugates had a 6-fold increase that was faster than even heat shock chaperone HSP101. Similar changes were observed with exposure to ethanol and reactive oxide species generator H_{2}O_{2}.

== SUMOylation and AtSCE1 ==
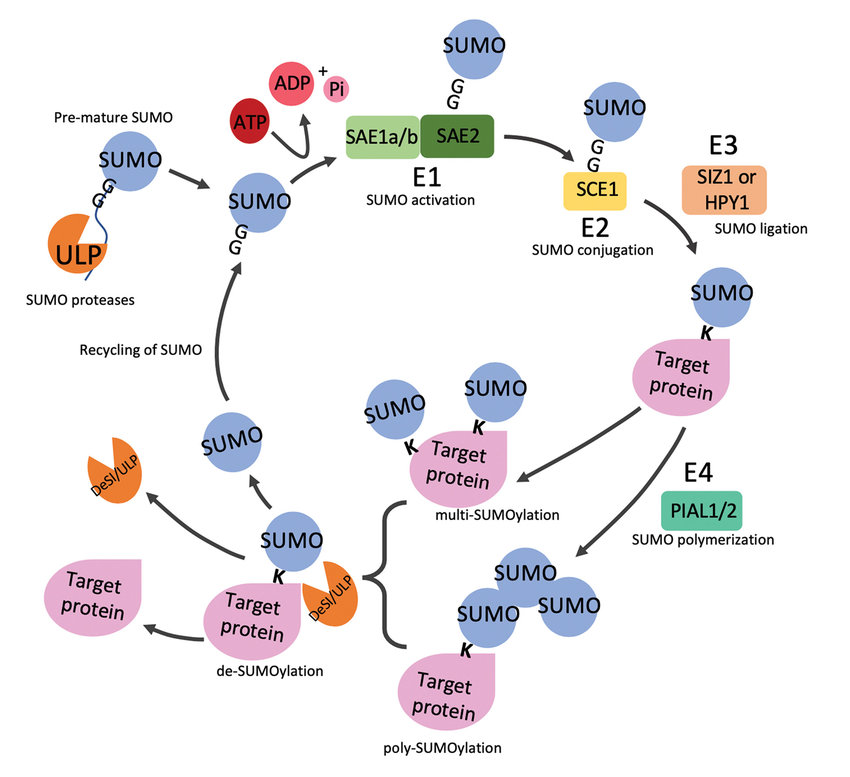
The SUMOylation pathway in Arabidopsis thaliana

The SUMO pathway occurs both in the nucleus and in the cytosol of plant cells, and over 400 substrates in several model organisms have been identified. After a SUMO protein is expressed, it must be processed by a protease, which cleaves several amino acids off the tail, exposing the double glycine motif. It is activated through the hydrolysis of ATP, which facilitates the creation of a thioester bond to the active site of the heterodimer AtSAE1a/b and AtSAE2. The SUMO peptide is transferred to residue C94 on AtSCE1 through a transesterification reaction. The pathway can end here with the conjugation of the E2 SUMO-SCE1 complex with a target protein, however it often needs direction from an E3 ligase. SUMO chains can also be created on a target protein through E4 polymerases, which may signal for the SUMOylated protein to be de-SUMOylated, though this has not been shown to be required for this recycling pathway.

== Structure ==
This enzyme is an aminoacyltransferase, which transfers an α-amino group to an α-keto acid, working in the Ubiquitin-like (Ubl) conjugation pathway. AtSCE1 has 160 residues, with its active site at residue C94. Residues 5-158 are a ubiquitin-conjugating (UBC) core domain. It has five α-helices, five β-sheets, and three turns. The active cysteine is between the fourth β-sheet and the second α-helix. The function of AtSCE1 appears to be sensitive to the structure of the enzyme. Though it shares 65% sequence identity with the human E2 equivalent Ubc9, mutant studies have shown that it Ubc9 cannot couple with AtSCE1. The residues that interact with E1 in A. thaliana are conserved except at four places, one being V37, which is methionine in humans. Point mutations at V37 lead to a loss in complementation with AtSAE1.

== Function ==
SUMOylation modifies many cellular processes in plants, including protein-protein interactions, nuclear-cytoplasmic and RNA transport, and transcriptional regulation, repairing DNA, cytoplasmic signal transduction, sub-nuclear compartmentalization, and more. AtSCE1 is essential to completing this pathway, which has been supported by mutagenesis studies. AtSAE2 and AtSCE1 knock-out mutants are embryonic lethal at an early point of development. One protein that can has been shown to be SUMOylated is SnRK1. This protein kinase is an early member of a signal cascade that alerts the plant of its carbon status. SnRK1 has been show to influence the expression of 1000 genes, and its presence reduces plant growth through the inhibition of nitrogen and carbon metabolism, thus it is carefully controlled. SUMOylation appears to trigger ubiquitination, creating a negative feedback loop to bring down these levels of this important signaling compound. Another AtSCE1 target is AtMMS21, which encourages root cell proliferation. This interaction requires the assistance of the SUMO E3 ligase.
