= Thiamphenicol glycinate acetylcysteine =

Combination drug

- Chemical structures of thiamphenicol glycinate (top) and acetylcysteine (bottom)

Combination of
- Thiamphenicol glycinate: Antibiotic
- Acetylcysteine: Mucoactive agent

Identifiers
- CAS Number: 20192-91-0
- PubChem CID: 44147002
- UNII: 7I3XBP3IFP
- CompTox Dashboard (EPA): DTXSID10942260
- ECHA InfoCard: 100.039.597

Chemical and physical data
- Formula: C_{19}H_{27}Cl_{2}N_{3}O_{9}S_{2}
- Molar mass: 576.46 g·mol^{−1}
- 3D model (JSmol): Interactive image
- SMILES: CC(=O)NC(CS)C(=O)O.CS(=O)(=O)C1=CC=C(C=C1)C(C(COC(=O)CN)NC(=O)C(Cl)Cl)O

Thiamphenicol glycinate acetylcysteine (TGA) is a pharmaceutical drug that is a combination of thiamphenicol glycinate ester (TAFGE), which is a derivative of the antibiotic thiamphenicol, and N-acetylcysteine (NAC), which is a mucus-thinning drug. Upon contact with tissue esterases, TGA releases both TAFGE and NAC. As a standalone medication, NAC is widely used in respiratory tract infections for its mucolytic activity.

== Medical uses ==
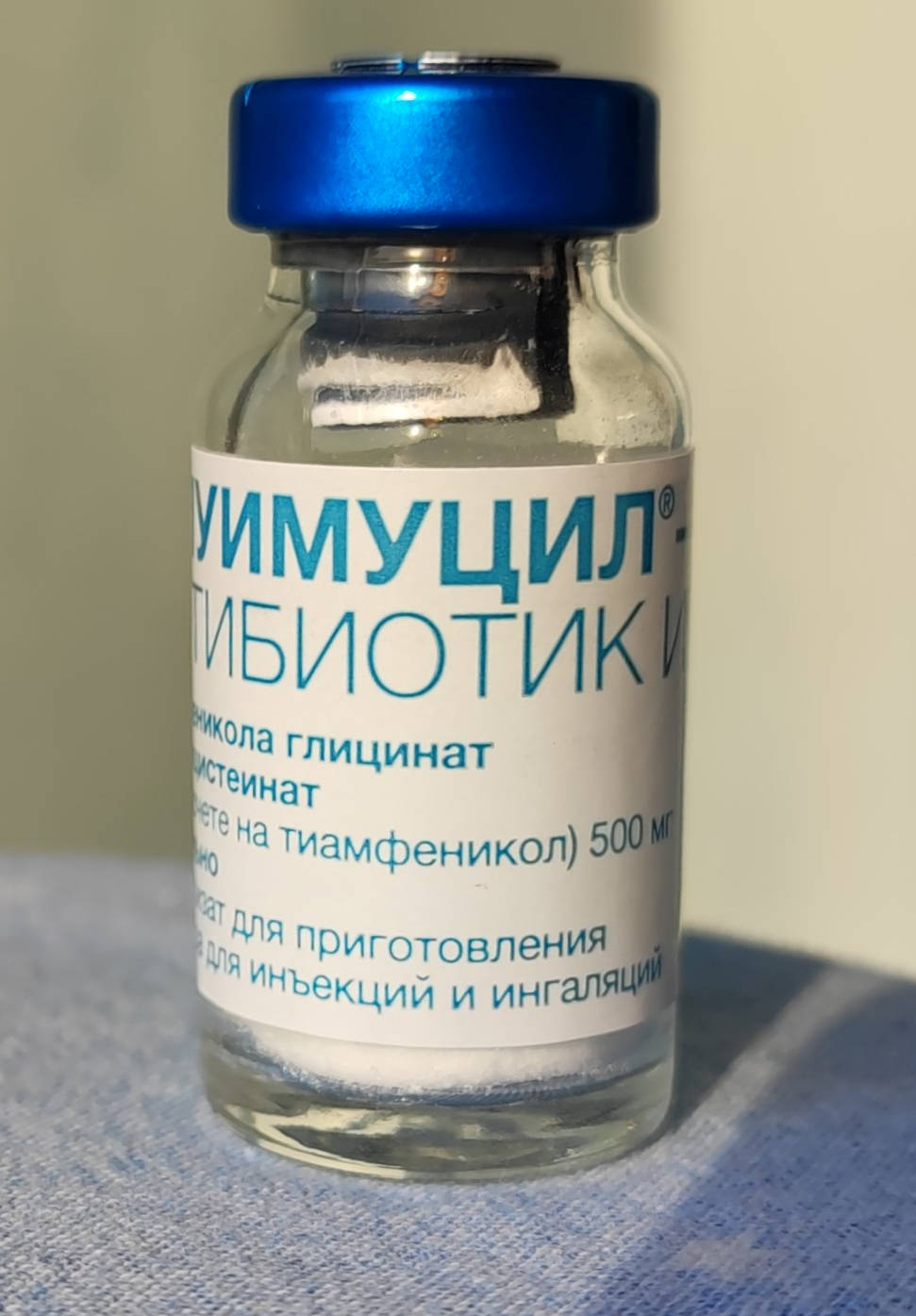
A vial of thiamphenicol glycinate acetylcysteine for IM administration produced in Eastern Europe.

Thiamphenicol glycinate acetylcysteine (TGA) effectively treats upper respiratory tract infections, including otitis media, pharyngotonsillitis, and rhinosinusitis. It is also used to treat exacerbations of chronic obstructive pulmonary disease (COPD) and chronic bronchitis with bronchiectasis.

TGA is effective in eradicating biofilms in otolaryngologic infections, as biofilms are often resistant to treatment with antibiotics. Biofilms are complex communities of bacteria that can adhere to surfaces and are known to be highly resistant to antibiotic treatment and immune responses, so the ability of TGA to effectively eradicate biofilms represents an advantage over traditional antibiotics.

== Mechanism of action ==
TGA works by releasing thiamphenicol glycinate ester (TAFGE) and N-acetylcysteine (NAC) upon contact with tissue esterases. Esterases are enzymes that break down esters into an acid and an alcohol in a chemical reaction with water called hydrolysis. Such reaction is needed to split TGA into its active components. TAFGE is an antibiotic, while NAC has mucolytic properties.

Thiamphenicol and TAFGE are related compounds, but they have different forms and uses: thiamphenicol is an antibiotic that is the methyl-and-sulfonyl analogue of chloramphenicol; it has a similar spectrum of activity to chloramphenicol but is 2.5 to 5 times as potent; it is used in many countries as a veterinary antibiotic, but is also used in some countries such as Brazil, China, Italy, Moldova and Morocco for use in humans. On the other hand, TAFGE is a form of thiamphenicol that is used in parenteral and aerosol dosage forms. After administration, TAFGE is rapidly hydrolysed by tissue esterases, releasing thiamphenicol. Its antibacterial activity is due to thiamphenicol.

== Routes of Administration ==
TGA can be administered intramuscularly or by aerosol. It can be used by a sprayer or via a nebulizer.

== Brand name ==
TGA is sold under various brand names, including "Fluimucil Antibiotic IT".
