= PGPEP1 =

Protein-coding gene in the species Homo sapiens

Identifiers
- Aliases: PGPEP1, PAP-I, PGP, PGP-I, PGPI, Pcp, pyroglutamyl-peptidase I, PGI
- External IDs: OMIM: 610694; MGI: 1913772; HomoloGene: 9793; GeneCards: PGPEP1; OMA:PGPEP1 - orthologs

Gene location (Human)
Chr.	Chromosome 19 (human)
Band	19p13.11	Start	18,340,598 bp
Band	19p13.11	End	18,369,950 bp

Gene location (Mouse)
Chr.	Chromosome 8 (mouse)
Band	8|8 B3.3	Start	70,646,435 bp
Band	8|8 B3.3	End	70,660,388 bp
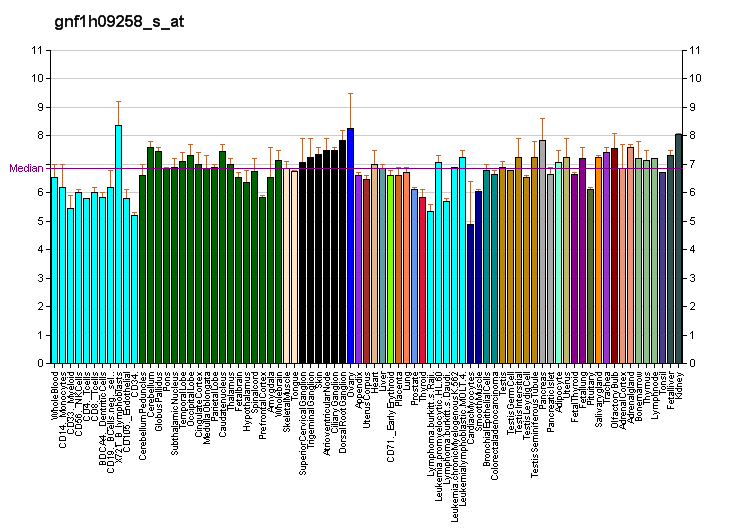

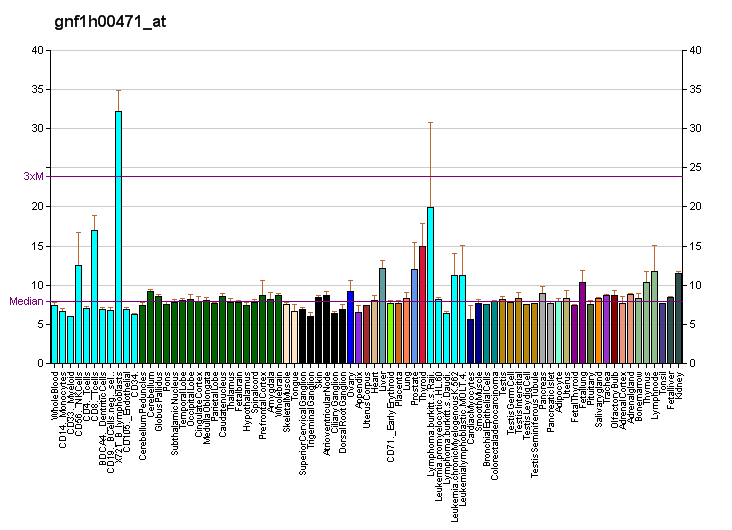

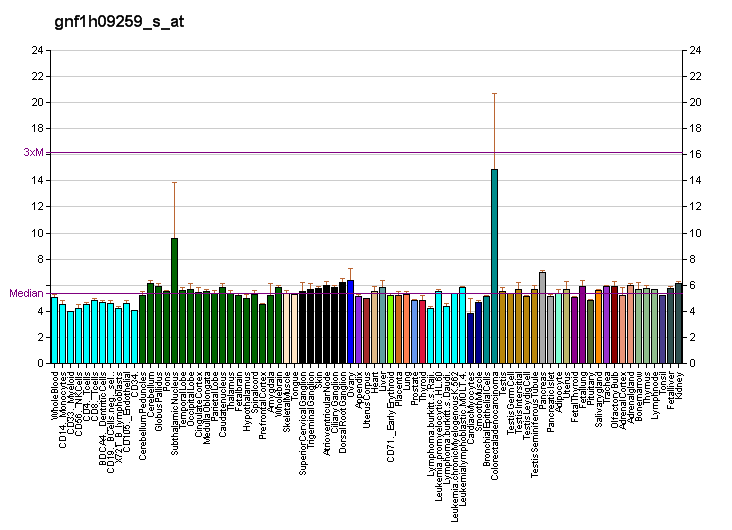
RNA expression pattern
Bgee	Human / Mouse (ortholog); Top expressed in: cardia; renal medulla; tendon of biceps brachii; pylorus; inferior ganglion of vagus nerve; internal globus pallidus; external globus pallidus; vena cava; ventral tegmental area; subthalamic nucleus / Top expressed in: right kidney; proximal tubule; ventricular zone; human kidney; epithelium of small intestine; neural tube; adrenal gland; yolk sac; jejunum; ileum; More reference expression data
BioGPS	More reference expression data
Gene ontology
Molecular function	peptidase activity; cysteine-type peptidase activity; hydrolase activity; pyroglutamyl-peptidase activity
Cellular component	cytoplasm; cytosol
Biological process	proteolysis
Sources:Amigo / QuickGO
Orthologs
Species	Human	Mouse
Entrez	54858	66522
Ensembl	ENSG00000130517	ENSMUSG00000056204
UniProt	Q9NXJ5	Q9ESW8
RefSeq (mRNA)	NM_001300927; NM_001308366; NM_017712; NM_001329471; NM_001329476 NM_001329477; NM_001329478	NM_023217
RefSeq (protein)	NP_001287856; NP_001295295; NP_001316400; NP_001316405; NP_001316406 NP_001316407; NP_060182	NP_075706
Location (UCSC)	Chr 19: 18.34 – 18.37 Mb	Chr 8: 70.65 – 70.66 Mb
PubMed search
- Wikidata
View/Edit Human	View/Edit Mouse

The PGPEP1 gene in humans encodes the enzyme Pyroglutamyl-peptidase I.
