= Rumack–Matthew nomogram =

Acetaminophen toxicity nomogram

Rumack Matthew Nomogram with treatment line added at 150. It is a semi-log plot with acetaminophen levels (on a logarithmic scale) along the vertical axis versus time (on a linear scale) along the horizontal axis.

Rumack–Matthew Nomogram showing acetaminophen level versus time as a method of interpreting levels and assessing severity and need for treatment.

The Rumack–Matthew nomogram, also known as the acetaminophen nomogram, is an acetaminophen toxicity nomogram. It plots serum concentration of acetaminophen against the time since ingestion, in order to predict possible liver toxicity and allow a clinician to decide whether to proceed with N-Acetylcysteine (NAC) treatment. It is a logarithmic graph starting 4 hours after ingestion; at this time the absorption of acetaminophen is considered likely to be complete.

This nomogram allows for timely management of an acetaminophen overdose. Generally, a serum plasma concentration (APAP) of 140–150 μg/mL (or mg/L) at 4 hours post-ingestion indicates the need for NAC treatment. This nomogram is not used alone if the patient has altered mental status or if the history is not reliable; rather, an additional line should be drawn and plotted to see if the slope of the line remains at or above the nomogram. Additionally, a formal half-life may also be determined, by measuring concentration first upon admission of the patient and again 4 hours later; from these measurements, half-life can be calculated. If half-life is more than 4 hours, then treatment is necessary to prevent hepatotoxicity and liver failure.

The original line, sometimes referred to as the Rumack–Matthew line, starts at 200 μg/mL at 4 hours and was published in 1975 by Barry H. Rumack and Henry Matthew. When the NAC study began in 1976, the U.S. Food and Drug Administration (FDA) required a line that was 25% below the original. This line is referred to as the treatment line and starts at 150 μg/mL at 4 hours. It is the usual line used in the United States to determine treatment of acetaminophen overdose after the publication of the NAC study in 1981. With early NAC and supportive therapy, the majority of patients recover with no adverse effects. Of patients that progress to acute liver failure, 65% of patients will recover; the remainder will either require liver transplantation or die.
