= 5-oxoprolinase (ATP-hydrolysing) =

Class of enzymes

5-oxoprolinase (ATP-hydrolyzing)

Identifiers
- EC no.: 3.5.2.9
- CAS no.: 9075-46-1

Databases
- BRENDA: enzyme data
- ExPASy: NiceZyme view
- KEGG: enzyme entry
- MetaCyc: metabolic pathway
- Rhea: reactions
- PDB structures: RCSB PDB PDBe PDBsum
- Gene Ontology: AmiGO / QuickGO
Search
- PMC: articles
- PubMed: articles
- NCBI: proteins

5-oxoprolinase (ATP-hydrolysing) (EC 3.5.2.9) is an enzyme characterised from rat kidney that catalyzes the hydrolysis reaction:

(S)-pyroglutamic acid
H_{2}O
H_{2}O
L-glutamic acid

The enzyme uses adenosine triphosphate to drive the reversible reaction towards L-glutamic acid: its byproducts are adenosine diphosphate and orthophosphate. The reaction is part of the glutathione cycle.

This enzyme is a hydrolase, one acting on carbon-nitrogen bonds other than peptide bonds, specifically in cyclic amides. The systematic name of this enzyme class is 5-oxo-L-proline amidohydrolase (ATP-hydrolysing). Other names in common use include pyroglutamase (ATP-hydrolysing), oxoprolinase, pyroglutamase, 5-oxoprolinase, pyroglutamate hydrolase, pyroglutamic hydrolase, L-pyroglutamate hydrolase, 5-oxo-L-prolinase, and pyroglutamase.
