= TRHDE =

Protein-coding gene in the species Homo sapiens

Identifiers
- Aliases: TRHDE, PAP-II, PGPEP2, TRH-DE, thyrotropin releasing hormone degrading enzyme
- External IDs: OMIM: 606950; MGI: 2384311; GeneCards: TRHDE
Enzyme activity
EC #	BRENDA	ExPASy	KEGG	MetaCyc
3.4.19.6	↗	↗	↗	↗

Gene location (Human)
Chr.	Chromosome 12 (human)
Band	12q21.1	Start	72,087,266 bp
Band	12q21.1	End	72,670,758 bp

Gene location (Mouse)
Chr.	Chromosome 10 (mouse)
Band	10|10 D2	Start	114,234,726 bp
Band	10|10 D2	End	114,638,212 bp
RNA expression pattern
Bgee	Human / Mouse (ortholog); Top expressed in: jejunal mucosa; stromal cell of endometrium; endothelial cell; Brodmann area 23; kidney tubule; orbitofrontal cortex; superior frontal gyrus; Brodmann area 46; postcentral gyrus; middle temporal gyrus / Top expressed in: retinal pigment epithelium; trigeminal ganglion; primary visual cortex; hippocampus proper; cerebellar cortex; dentate gyrus of hippocampal formation granule cell; superior frontal gyrus; substantia nigra; lobe of cerebellum; supraoptic nucleus; More reference expression data
BioGPS	n/a
Gene ontology
Molecular function	peptide binding; zinc ion binding; peptidase activity; aminopeptidase activity; metalloaminopeptidase activity; metallopeptidase activity; hydrolase activity; metal ion binding
Cellular component	cytoplasm; integral component of membrane; integral component of plasma membrane; extracellular exosome; membrane; plasma membrane
Biological process	regulation of blood pressure; cell-cell signaling; signal transduction; proteolysis; peptide catabolic process
Sources:Amigo / QuickGO
Orthologs
Databases	NCBI: entry; OMA: entry
Species	Human	Mouse
Entrez	29953	237553
Ensembl	ENSG00000072657	ENSMUSG00000050663
UniProt	Q9UKU6	Q8K093
RefSeq (mRNA)	NM_013381	NM_146241
RefSeq (protein)	NP_037513	NP_666353
Location (UCSC)	Chr 12: 72.09 – 72.67 Mb	Chr 10: 114.23 – 114.64 Mb
PubMed search
- Wikidata
View/Edit Human	View/Edit Mouse

Thyrotropin releasing hormone degrading enzyme is a protein, specifically a pyroglutamyl-peptidase II enzyme, that in humans is encoded by the TRHDE gene.

== Function ==
This gene encodes a member of the peptidase M1 family. The encoded protein is an extracellular peptidase that specifically cleaves and inactivates the neuropeptide thyrotropin-releasing hormone.
