= Pyrrolidonyl-β-naphthylamide =

Names
- IUPAC name N^{1}-(Naphthalen-2-yl)-5-oxo-L-prolinamide
- Systematic IUPAC name (2S)-N-(Naphthalen-2-yl)-5-oxopyrrolidine-2-carboxamide
- Other names Pyrrolidonyl-beta-naphthylamide

Identifiers
CAS Number	22155-91-5
3D model (JSmol)	Interactive image
ChemSpider	81932
ECHA InfoCard	100.040.721
PubChem CID	90745
UNII	6G5U8A2YEH
CompTox Dashboard (EPA)	DTXSID201336799 DTXSID10944800, DTXSID201336799
- InChI: InChI=1S/C15H14N2O2/c18-14-8-7-13(17-14)15(19)16-12-6-5-10-3-1-2-4-11(10)9-12/h1-6,9,13H,7-8H2,(H,16,19)(H,17,18) Key: BZEPQNMASTUAMY-UHFFFAOYSA-N; InChI=1/C15H14N2O2/c18-14-8-7-13(17-14)15(19)16-12-6-5-10-3-1-2-4-11(10)9-12/h1-6,9,13H,7-8H2,(H,16,19)(H,17,18) Key: BZEPQNMASTUAMY-UHFFFAOYAS
- SMILES: O=C(Nc2cc1ccccc1cc2)C3NC(=O)CC3

Properties
Chemical formula	C_{15}H_{14}N_{2}O_{2}
Molar mass	254.289 g·mol^{−1}
- Except where otherwise noted, data are given for materials in their standard state (at 25 °C [77 °F], 100 kPa). verify (what is ?) Infobox references

Pyrrolidonyl-β-naphthylamide (PYR) is a molecule used in microbiology to detect the presence of pyrrolidonyl peptidase. In the presence of bacteria with pyrrolidonyl peptidase, it is broken down to pyroglutamic acid and 2-naphthylamine. To detect this process, p-dimethylaminocinnamaldehyde is added and a change to a pink color can then be detected.
