= Pyroglutamate aminopeptidase =

Type of enzyme

Pyroglutamate aminopeptidase is a type of enzyme that cleaves the peptide bond linking the N-terminal end of a polypeptide forming a cyclical lactam to the next amino acid residue. This cyclic structure protects the polypeptide from degradation but renders the protein difficult to analyze in the laboratory. Pyroglutamate aminopeptidase may be used to cleave the cyclical lactam and will therefore leave the next amino acid with a free N-terminal.

== See also ==
- Pyroglutamyl-peptidase I
- Pyroglutamyl-peptidase II
