= Acetylcysteine =

Medication used to treat overdose of paracetamol

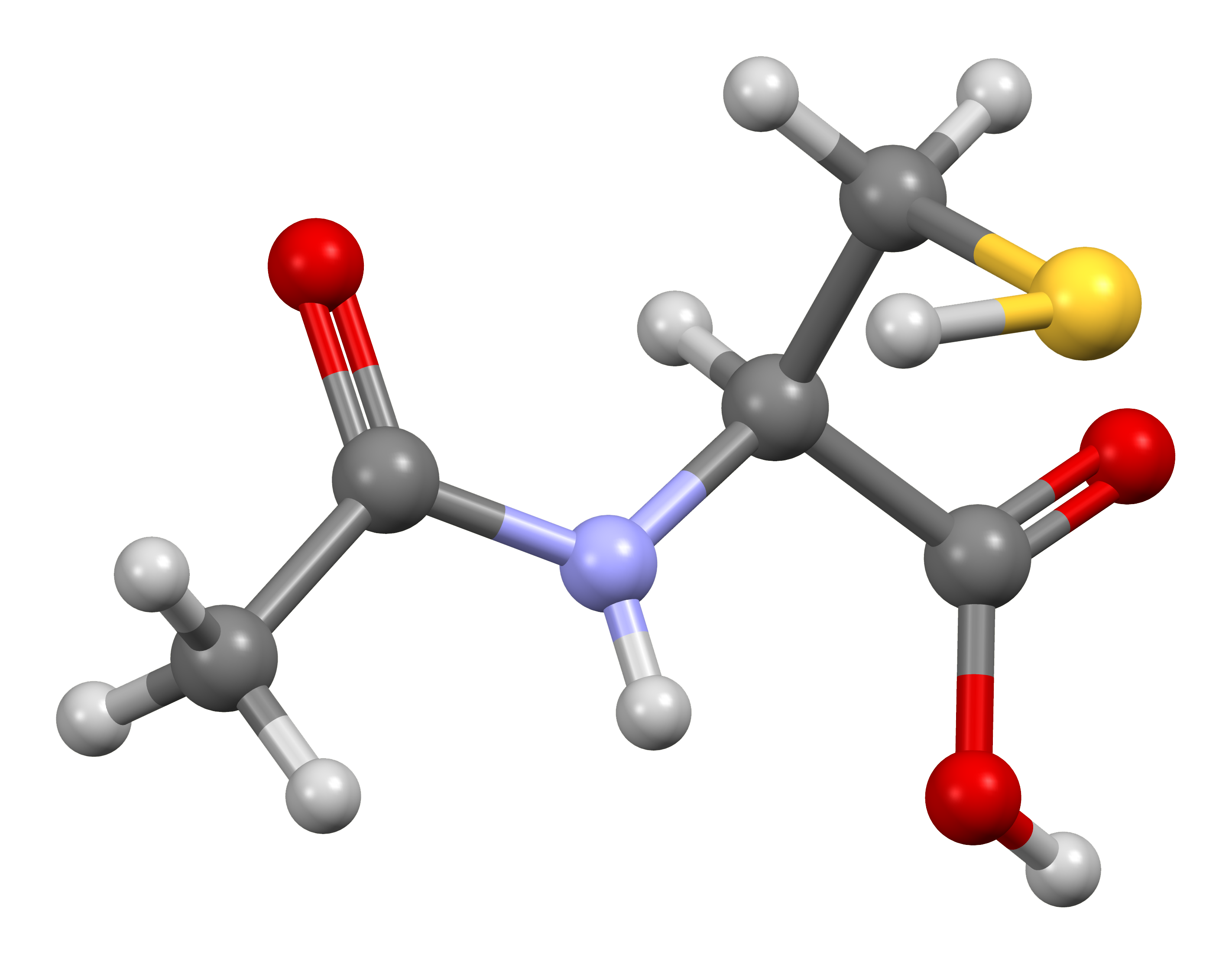

Clinical data
- Pronunciation: /əˌsiːtəlˈsɪstiːn/ and similar (/əˌsɛtəl-, ˌæsɪtəl-, -tiːn/)
- Trade names: ACC 200, Acetadote, Fluimucil, Mucomyst, others
- Other names: N-acetylcysteine; N-acetyl-L-cysteine; NALC; NAC
- AHFS/Drugs.com: Monograph
- MedlinePlus: a615021
- License data: US DailyMed: Acetylcysteine
- Pregnancy category: AU: B2
- Routes of administration: Oral, intravenous, inhalation
- ATC code: R05CB01 (WHO) S01XA08 (WHO) V03AB23 (WHO)

Legal status
- Legal status: AU: S4 (Prescription only) and Schedule 2; NZ: Prescription only; UK: POM (Prescription only); US: OTC & Rx

Pharmacokinetic data
- Bioavailability: 6–10% (Oral) nearly 100% (intravenous)
- Protein binding: 50 to 83%
- Metabolism: Liver
- Elimination half-life: 5.6 hours
- Excretion: Kidney (30%), faecal (3%)

Identifiers
- IUPAC name: (2R)-2-acetamido-3-sulfanylpropanoic acid
- CAS Number: 616-91-1
- PubChem CID: 12035
- DrugBank: DB06151
- ChemSpider: 11540
- UNII: WYQ7N0BPYC
- KEGG: D00221
- ChEBI: CHEBI:28939
- ChEMBL: ChEMBL600
- CompTox Dashboard (EPA): DTXSID5020021
- ECHA InfoCard: 100.009.545

Chemical and physical data
- Formula: C_{5}H_{9}NO_{3}S
- Molar mass: 163.19 g·mol^{−1}
- 3D model (JSmol): Interactive image
- Specific rotation: +5° (c = 3% in water)
- Melting point: 109 to 110 °C (228 to 230 °F)
- SMILES: C/C(=N/[C@@H](CS)C(=O)O)/O
- InChI: InChI=1S/C5H9NO3S/c1-3(7)6-4(2-10)5(8)9/h4,10H,2H2,1H3,(H,6,7)(H,8,9)/t4-/m0/s1; Key:PWKSKIMOESPYIA-BYPYZUCNSA-N

Acetylcysteine or N-acetylcysteine (NAC) is a mucolytic that is used to treat paracetamol (acetaminophen) overdose and to loosen thick mucus in individuals with chronic bronchopulmonary disorders, such as pneumonia and bronchitis. It has been used to treat lactobezoar in infants. It can be taken intravenously, orally (swallowed by mouth), or by inhalation by use of a nebulizer. It is also sometimes used as a dietary supplement.

Common side effects include nausea and vomiting when taken orally. The skin may occasionally become red and itchy with any route of administration. A non-immune type of anaphylaxis may also occur. It appears to be safe in pregnancy. For paracetamol overdose, it works by increasing the level of glutathione, an antioxidant that can neutralize the toxic breakdown products of paracetamol. When inhaled, it acts as a mucolytic by decreasing the thickness of mucus.

Acetylcysteine was initially patented in 1960 and came into medical use in 1968. It is on the World Health Organization's List of Essential Medicines. It is available as a generic medication.

== Uses ==
=== Medical uses ===
==== Paracetamol overdose antidote ====
Intravenous and oral formulations of acetylcysteine are available for the treatment of paracetamol (acetaminophen) overdose. When paracetamol is taken in large quantities, a toxic minor metabolite called N-acetyl-p-benzoquinone imine (NAPQI) accumulates within the body. It is normally conjugated by glutathione (GSH), but when taken in excess, the body's glutathione reserves are not sufficient to deactivate the toxic NAPQI. This metabolite is then free to react with key hepatic enzymes, thereby damaging liver cells. This may lead to severe liver damage and even death by acute liver failure. Liver necrosis is observed in animals at ~70% GSH depletion, and normal liver GSH is approximately 4 mmol/L.

In the treatment of paracetamol (acetaminophen) overdose, acetylcysteine acts to maintain or replenish depleted glutathione reserves in the liver and enhance non-toxic metabolism of acetaminophen. These actions serve to protect liver cells from NAPQI toxicity. It is most effective in preventing or lessening hepatic injury when administered within 8–10 hours after overdose. Research suggests that the rate of liver toxicity is approximately 3% when acetylcysteine is administered within 10 hours of overdose. To decide whether NAC treatment is warranted, the Rumack–Matthew nomogram may be consulted.

Although IV and oral acetylcysteine are equally effective for this indication, oral administration is generally poorly tolerated due to the higher dosing required to overcome its low oral bioavailability, its foul taste and odor, and a higher incidence of adverse effects when taken orally, particularly nausea and vomiting. Prior pharmacokinetic studies of acetylcysteine did not consider acetylation as a reason for the low bioavailability of acetylcysteine. Oral acetylcysteine is identical in bioavailability to cysteine precursors. However, 3% to 6% of people given intravenous acetylcysteine show a severe, anaphylaxis-like allergic reaction, which may include extreme breathing difficulty (due to bronchospasm), a decrease in blood pressure, rash, angioedema, and sometimes also nausea and vomiting. Repeated doses of intravenous acetylcysteine will cause these allergic reactions to progressively worsen in these people.

Several studies have found this anaphylaxis-like reaction to occur more often in people given intravenous acetylcysteine despite serum levels of paracetamol not high enough to be considered toxic.

==== Mucolytic agent ====
Acetylcysteine exhibits mucolytic properties, meaning it reduces the viscosity and adhesiveness of mucus. This therapeutic effect is achieved through the cleavage of disulfide bonds within mucoproteins (strongly cross-linked mucins), thereby decreasing the mucus viscosity and facilitating its clearance from the respiratory tract. This mechanism is particularly beneficial in conditions characterized by excessive or thickened mucus, such as chronic obstructive pulmonary disease (COPD), cystic fibrosis, rhinitis or sinusitis. Acetylcysteine can be administered as a part of a complex molecule, thiamphenicol glycinate acetylcysteine, which also contains thiamphenicol, an antibiotic.

==== Lungs ====
Inhaled acetylcysteine is also used post-operatively, as a diagnostic aid, and in tracheotomy care. It may be considered ineffective in cystic fibrosis. A 2013 Cochrane review in cystic fibrosis found no evidence of benefit.

Acetylcysteine is used in the treatment of obstructive lung disease as an adjuvant treatment.

=== Other uses ===
Acetylcysteine has been used to complex palladium, to help it dissolve in water. This helps to remove palladium from drugs or precursors synthesized by palladium-catalyzed coupling reactions. N-acetylcysteine can be used to protect the liver.

==== Microbiological use ====
Acetylcysteine can be used in Petroff's method of liquefaction and decontamination of sputum, in preparation for recovery of mycobacterium. It also displays significant antiviral activity against influenza A viruses.

Acetylcysteine has bactericidal properties and breaks down bacterial biofilms of clinically relevant pathogens including Pseudomonas aeruginosa, Staphylococcus aureus, Enterococcus faecalis, Enterobacter cloacae, Staphylococcus epidermidis, and Klebsiella pneumoniae.

== Side effects ==
The most commonly reported adverse effects for I.V. formulations of acetylcysteine are rash, urticaria, and itchiness.

Adverse effects for inhalational formulations of acetylcysteine include nausea, vomiting, stomatitis, fever, rhinorrhea, drowsiness, clamminess, chest tightness, and bronchoconstriction. Although infrequent, bronchospasm has been reported to occur unpredictably in some patients.

Adverse effects for oral formulations of acetylcysteine have been reported to include nausea, vomiting, rash, and fever.

Large doses in a mouse model showed that acetylcysteine could potentially cause damage to the heart and lungs. They found that acetylcysteine was metabolized to S-nitroso-N-acetylcysteine (SNOAC), which increased blood pressure in the lungs and right ventricle of the heart (pulmonary artery hypertension) in mice treated with acetylcysteine. The effect was similar to that observed following a 3-week exposure to an oxygen-deprived environment (chronic hypoxia). The authors also found that SNOAC induced a hypoxia-like response in the expression of several important genes both in vitro and in vivo. The implications of these findings for long-term treatment with acetylcysteine have not yet been investigated. The dose used by Palmer and colleagues was dramatically higher than that used in humans, the equivalent of about 20 grams per day. In humans, much lower dosages (600 mg per day) have been observed to counteract some age-related decline in the hypoxic ventilatory response as tested by inducing prolonged hypoxia.

Although N-acetylcysteine prevented liver damage in mice when taken before alcohol, when taken four hours after alcohol it made liver damage worse in a dose-dependent fashion.

== Pharmacology ==
=== Pharmacodynamics ===
Acetylcysteine is a prodrug to L-cysteine, a precursor to the biologic antioxidant glutathione. Hence administration of acetylcysteine replenishes glutathione stores.

- Glutathione, along with oxidized glutathione (GSSG) and S-nitrosoglutathione (GSNO), have been found to bind to the glutamate recognition site of the NMDA and AMPA receptors (via their γ-glutamyl moieties), and may be endogenous neuromodulators. At millimolar concentrations, they may also modulate the redox state of the NMDA receptor complex. In addition, glutathione has been found to bind to and activate ionotropic receptors that are different from any other excitatory amino acid receptor, and which may constitute glutathione receptors, potentially making it a neurotransmitter. As such, since N-acetylcysteine is a prodrug of glutathione, it may modulate all of the aforementioned receptors as well.
- Glutathione also modulates the NMDA receptor by acting at the redox site.

Acetylcysteine also is a precursor to cystine, which in turn is a substrate for the cystine-glutamate antiporter on astrocytes; hence there is increasing glutamate release into the extracellular space. This glutamate in turn acts on mGluR_{2/3} receptors, and at higher doses of acetylcysteine, mGluR_{5}. Acetylcysteine may have other biological functions in the brain, such as the modulation of dopamine release and the reduction in inflammatory cytokine formation possibly via inhibiting NF-κB and modulating cytokine synthesis. These properties, along with the reduction of oxidative stress and the re-establishment of glutamatergic balance, would lead to an increase in growth factors, such as brain-derived neurotrophic factor (BDNF), and the regulation of neuronal cell death through B-cell lymphoma 2 (BLC-2) expression.

Catabolism to cysteine and cystine cannot fully explain the pharmacology of acetylcysteine. Recent work has shown that acetylcysteine can act as a rapid antioxidant via conversion to hydrogen sulfide and hydropersulfides, independent of glutathione elevation.

As mentioned before, acetylcysteine clears mucus by opening disulfide bonds.

=== Pharmacokinetics ===
The oral bioavailability of acetylcysteine is relatively low due to extensive first-pass metabolism in the gut wall and liver. It ranges between 6% and 10%.

Intravenous administration of acetylcysteine bypasses the first-pass metabolism, resulting in higher bioavailability compared to oral administration. Intravenous administration of acetylcysteine ensures nearly 100% bioavailability as it directly enters the bloodstream.

Acetylcysteine is extensively liver metabolized, CYP450 minimal. After a single IV administration, urine excretion is 30% at 0.11 L/hr/kg, with a half-life of 5.6 hours.

Acetylcysteine is the N-acetyl derivative of the amino acid L-cysteine and is a precursor in the formation of the antioxidant glutathione in the body. The thiol (sulfhydryl) group confers antioxidant effects and is able to reduce free radicals.

=== Adverse effect ===
Nitroglycerin interacts moderately with NAC, possibly resulting in hypotension and nitroglycerin-induced headache. Intravenous NAC can cause rate-related anaphylactoid reaction, usually mild.

== Chemistry ==
Pure acetylcysteine is in a solid state at room temperature, appearing as a white crystalline powder or granules. The solid form of acetylcysteine is stable under normal conditions, but it can undergo oxidation if exposed to air or moisture over time, leading to the formation of its dimeric form, diacetylcysteine, which can have different properties. Acetylcysteine is highly hygroscopic, i.e., it absorbs moisture if exposed to open air.

Acetylcysteine can sometimes appear as a light yellow cast powder instead of pure white due to oxidation. The sulfur-containing amino acids, like cysteine, are more easily oxidized than other amino acids. When exposed to air or moisture, acetylcysteine can oxidize, leading to a slight yellowish tint.

Acetylcysteine in a form of a white or white with light yellow cast powder has a pK_{a} of 3.14 (carboxyl group) and 9.5 (thiol) at 30 °C.

N-acetyl-L-cysteine is soluble in water and alcohol, and practically insoluble in chloroform and ether.

Acetylcysteine dissolves readily in water, forming a colorless solution. The pH of a 1% acetylcysteine solution in water typically ranges between 2.0 and 2.8. Solutions with higher concentrations of acetylcysteine have lower pH. Aqueous solutions of acetylcysteine are compatible with 0.9% sodium chloride solution; compatibility with 5% and 10% glucose solutions is also good.

As for photochemical stability, acetylcysteine in dry powder form is relatively stable and does not degrade quickly when exposed to light, but in aqueous solution, acetylcysteine can degrade when exposed to sunlight. In addition, acetylcysteine in aqueous solution can undergo hydrolysis, leading to the breakdown of the amide bond in the molecule. Still, aqueous solutions of acetylcysteine are generally stable when stored properly: the solutions should be kept in tightly sealed containers and stored at controlled room temperature to prolong the stability.

Acetylcysteine has been reported to have a pH of 2.2 when administered through inhalation.

== Society and culture ==
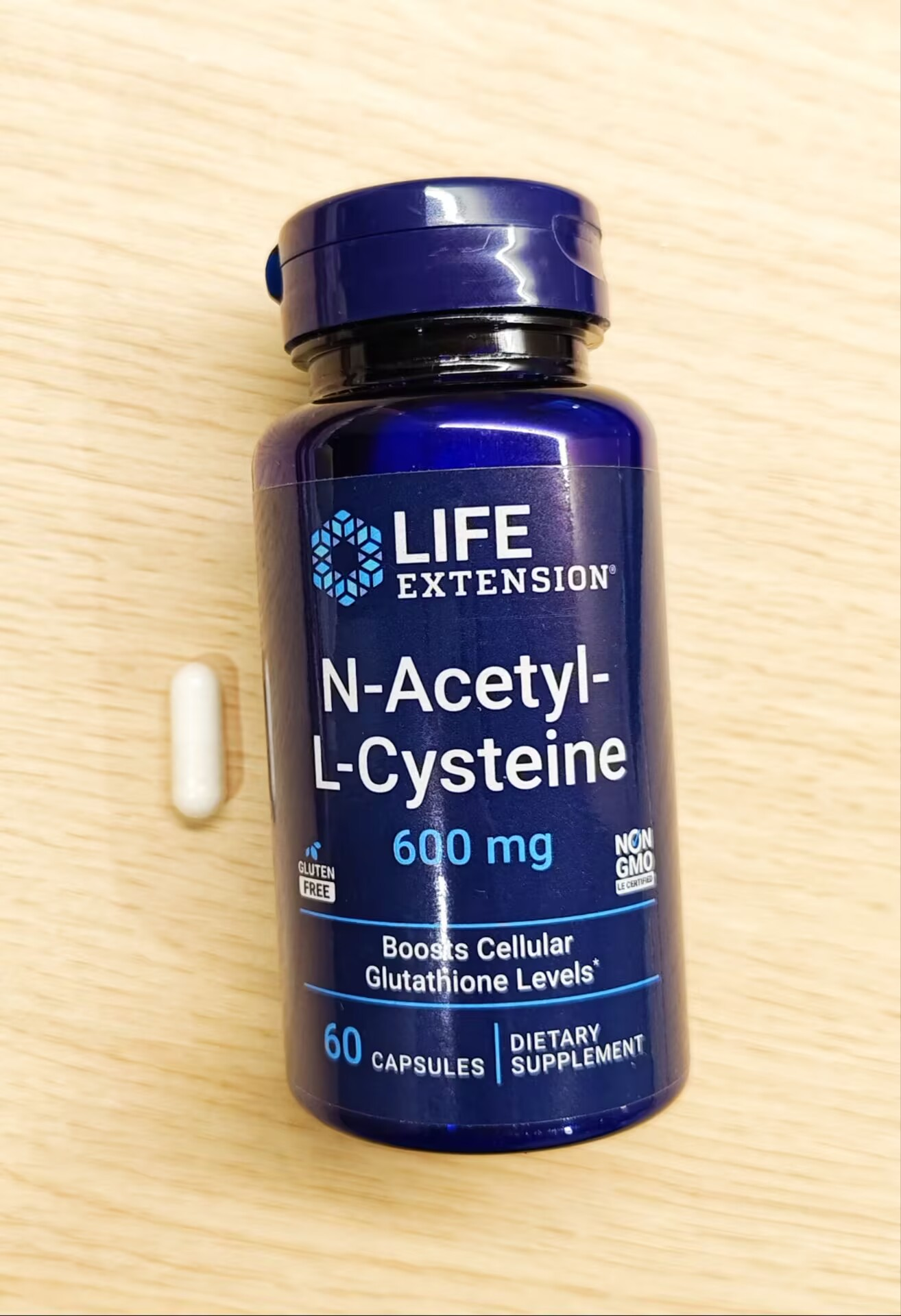
Acetylcysteine capsules sold by the supplement company Life Extension

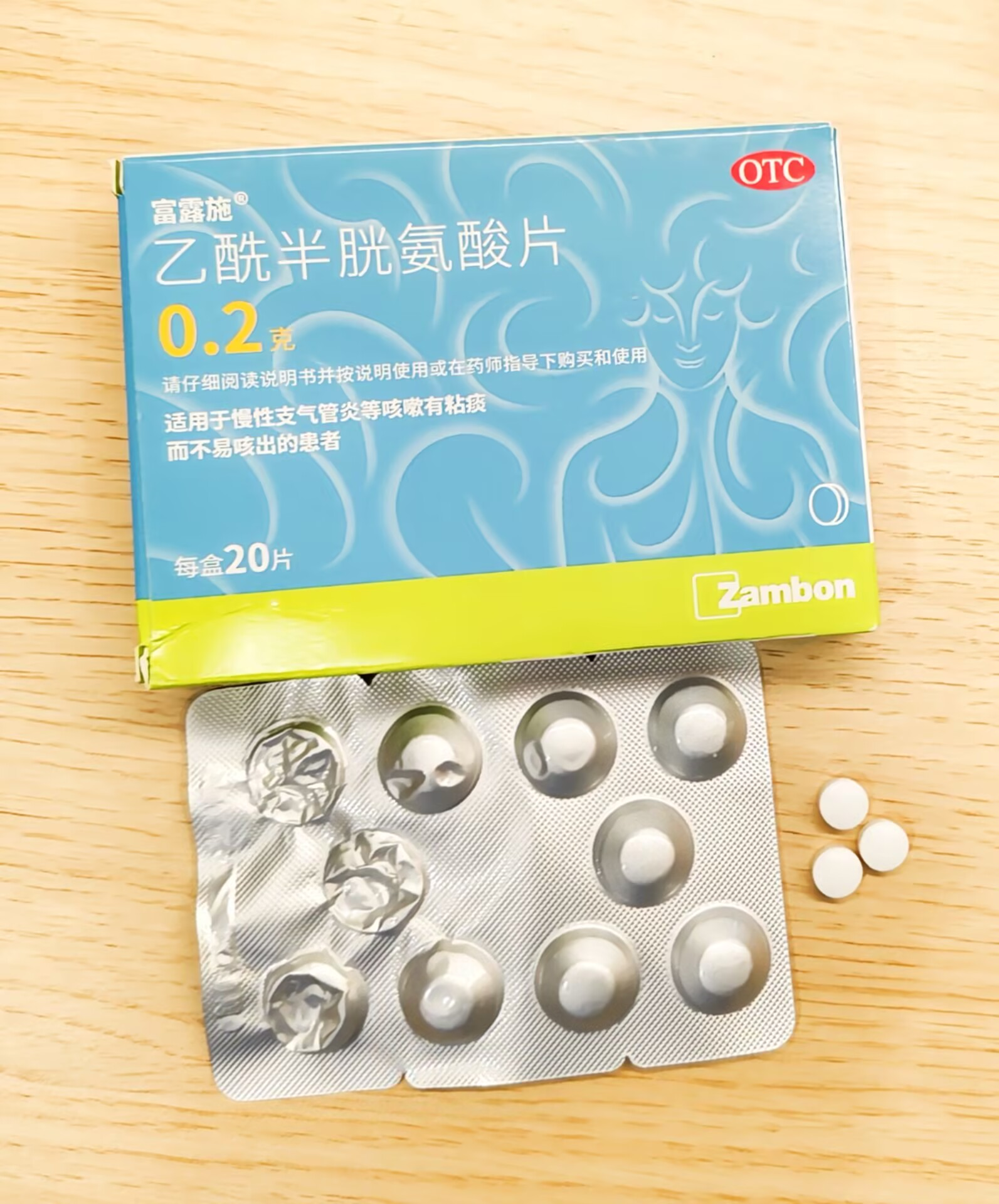
Over-the-counter (OTC) Acetylcysteine pills in China, with brand name Fluimucil

Acetylcysteine was patented in 1960 as a mucolytic agent. In the 1960s, it was used for managing the mucous symptoms of illnesses including cystic fibrosis, asthma, and chronic bronchitis, as well as other uses, such as a chelating agent in gold therapy.

In the late 1960s, the popularity of acetaminophen led to an increase in overdose hepatotoxicity. In 1974, it was discovered that the mechanism was oxidation via cytochrome P450, and administering glutathione-like reducing agents, such as IV cysteine, or oral methionine, were successful in preventing hepatotoxicity.

In the US, the then-common formulation of NAC was not certified as pyrogen-free, and thus not approved for IV use. The producer, Mead Johnson, was unwilling to take the expense of certification. In 1977, there was the first case report of oral NAC preventing acetaminophen overdose hepatoxicity in the US. Meanwhile, in the UK, IV NAC (trade name, Parvolex) was found to be more effective and has less side effect than IV cysteamine (associated with a "general feeling of misery") or methionine. There was a dispute concerning whether the oral NAC and the IV NAC is more effective, with the conclusion reached in 1999, that they are roughly equally effective. Another producer finally obtained approval for the IV form of NAC (trade name, Acetadote) in the US in 2004.

Amazon removed acetylcysteine for sale in the US in 2021, due to claims by the Food and Drug Administration (FDA) of it being classified as a drug rather than a supplement. In April 2022, the FDA released draft guidance on its policy regarding products labeled as dietary supplements that contain N-acetyl-L-cysteine. Amazon subsequently re-listed NAC products as of August 2022.

== Research ==
Acetylcysteine is under preliminary research for its potential to treat androgenetic alopecia (male baldness), with or without adjacent treatments such as with minoxidil. Acetylcysteine may have otoprotective properties and could be useful for preventing hearing loss and tinnitus in some cases.

Acetylcysteine may be an adjunct therapy for the treatment of addiction to cocaine, nicotine, alcohol, and other drugs.

=== Psychiatry ===
Acetylcysteine has been studied for major psychiatric disorders, including bipolar disorder, major depressive disorder, and schizophrenia.

Preliminary research indicates N-acetylcysteine may be useful in treating obsessive-compulsive disorder, specific drug addictions (cocaine), drug-induced neuropathy, trichotillomania, excoriation disorder, and a certain form of epilepsy (progressive myoclonic). Other research has tested N-acetylcysteine in anxiety disorder, attention deficit hyperactivity disorder and mild traumatic brain injury, although its efficacy for these conditions remains unestablished.

==== Addiction ====
Evidence to date does not support the efficacy for N-acetylcysteine in treating addictions to gambling, methamphetamine, or nicotine.

==== Bipolar disorder ====
In bipolar disorder, N-acetylcysteine has been repurposed as an augmentation strategy for depressive episodes in light of the possible role of inflammation in the pathogenesis of mood disorders. Nonetheless, meta-analytic evidence shows that add-on N-acetylcysteine was more effective than placebo only in reducing depression scales scores (low quality evidence), without positive effects on response and remission outcomes, limiting its possible role in clinical practice to date.

=== COVID-19 ===
Acetylcysteine has been studied as a possible treatment for COVID-19, but according to a paper published in 2023 it has not improved patient outcomes by common measures.

=== Poison antidote ===
Acetylcystine has been studied as a potential antidote to chlorine inhalation ex vivo. It is well-studied in the ozone-induced COPD model in rats.

It has been studied for paraquat poisoning in mice.
