= Rocky Mountain Poison and Drug Center =

Rocky Mountain Poison & Drug Safety
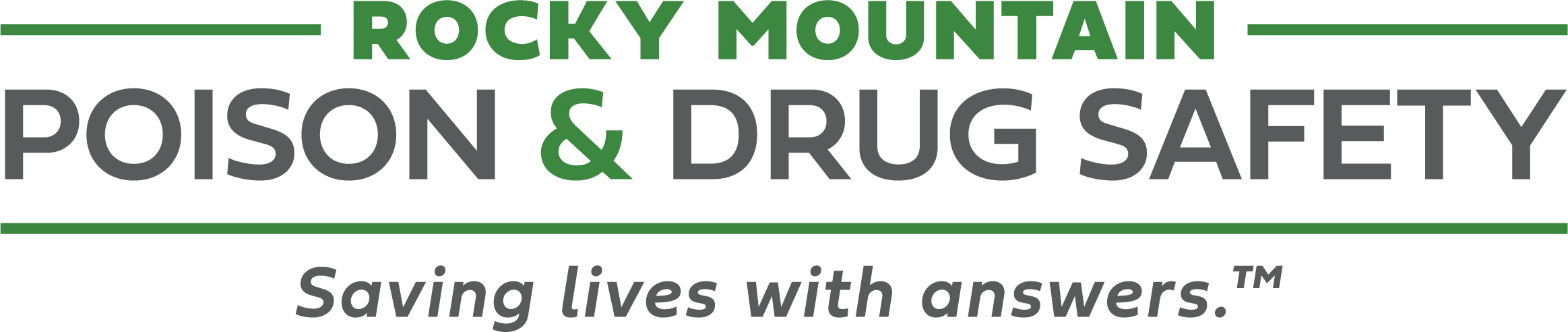

Geography
- Location: 1391 Speer Blvd, Denver, Colorado, United States
- Coordinates: 39.7382°N 104.9980°W

Organization
- Type: Poison Control Center, Research Contract Organization, Consumer Product and Drug Safety, Public Health

Links
- Website: rmpds.org
- Lists: Hospitals in Colorado

Rocky Mountain Poison & Drug Safety (RMPDS), formerly Rocky Mountain Poison and Drug Center (RMPDC), is a department within Denver Health Medical Center, an integrated health care organization based in Denver, Colorado.

Rocky Mountain Poison & Drug Safety provides specialized research, education, prevention, and treatment services to meet the needs of public health, government agencies, and the pharmaceutical and consumer products industries. RMPDS employs over 200 industry professionals, from medical information and medical management contact center staff to toxicology experts and research specialists.

In 1956 Dr. Winona Campbell, a pediatrician at Denver Health, founded the Rocky Mountain Poison and Drug Center in a small closet of the pediatrics ward at Denver Health.

== RADARS System ==
The Researched Abuse, Diversion and Addiction-Related Surveillance (RADARS) System has investigated the trends of prescription opioids, including but not limited to oxycodone, hydrocodone, hydromorphone, fentanyl, morphine, and tramadol. RADARS also examines emerging trends in drugs of abuse, such as the recent 400 percent increase in the abuse rate of gabapentin between 2006 and 2015. RADARS was founded in 2002 by Purdue Pharma.
