= Thiamphenicol =

Antibiotic

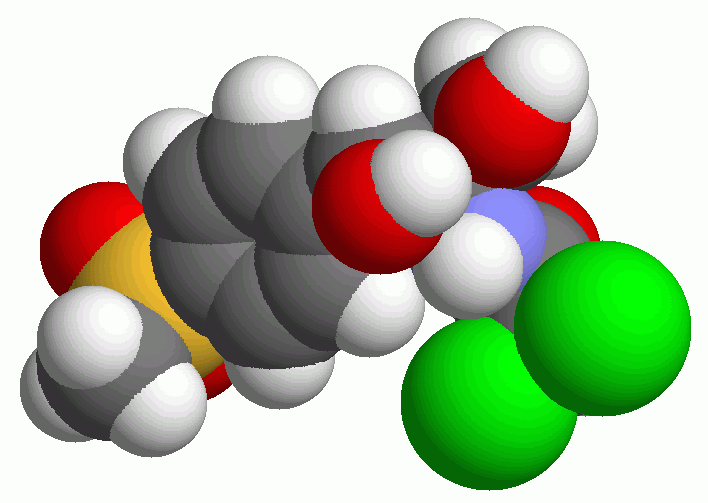

Clinical data
- Trade names: Urfamycin
- AHFS/Drugs.com: International Drug Names
- Routes of administration: IV, IM, oral
- ATC code: J01BA02 (WHO) QJ51BA02 (WHO)

Pharmacokinetic data
- Metabolism: hepatic
- Elimination half-life: 5.0 hours
- Excretion: renal

Identifiers
- IUPAC name: 2,2-dichloro-N-{(1R,2R)-2-hydroxy-1-(hydroxymethyl)-2-[4-(methylsulfonyl)phenyl]ethyl}acetamide
- CAS Number: 15318-45-3
- PubChem CID: 27200
- DrugBank: DB08621
- ChemSpider: 25315
- UNII: FLQ7571NPM
- KEGG: D01407
- ChEBI: CHEBI:32215
- ChEMBL: ChEMBL1236282
- CompTox Dashboard (EPA): DTXSID5021338
- ECHA InfoCard: 100.035.762

Chemical and physical data
- Formula: C_{12}H_{15}Cl_{2}NO_{5}S
- Molar mass: 356.21 g·mol^{−1}
- 3D model (JSmol): Interactive image
- Melting point: 164.3 to 166.3 °C (327.7 to 331.3 °F)
- SMILES: ClC(Cl)C(=O)N[C@@H]([C@H](O)c1ccc(cc1)S(=O)(=O)C)CO
- InChI: InChI=1S/C12H15Cl2NO5S/c1-21(19,20)8-4-2-7(3-5-8)10(17)9(6-16)15-12(18)11(13)14/h2-5,9-11,16-17H,6H2,1H3,(H,15,18)/t9-,10-/m1/s1; Key:OTVAEFIXJLOWRX-NXEZZACHSA-N

Thiamphenicol (also known as thiophenicol and dextrosulphenidol) is an antibiotic. It is the methyl-sulfonyl analogue of chloramphenicol and has a similar spectrum of activity, but is 2.5 to 5 times as potent. Like chloramphenicol, it is insoluble in water, but highly soluble in lipids. It is used in many countries as a veterinary antibiotic, but is available in China, Taiwan, Brazil, Morocco, and Italy for use in humans. Its main advantage over chloramphenicol is that it has never been associated with aplastic anaemia.

Thiamphenicol is also widely used in Brazil, particularly for the treatment of sexually transmitted infections such as pelvic inflammatory disease.

Unlike chloramphenicol, thiamphenicol is not readily metabolized in cattle, poultry, sheep, or humans, but is predominantly excreted unchanged. In pigs and rats the drug is excreted both as parent drug and as thiamphenicol glucuronate.

Thiamphenicol can be administered as a part of a complex molecule, Thiamphenicol glycinate acetylcysteine.
