= Pyroglutamyl-peptidase II =

Class of enzymes

Identifiers
- EC no.: 3.4.19.6
- CAS no.: 60063-88-9

Databases
- IntEnz: IntEnz view
- BRENDA: BRENDA entry
- ExPASy: NiceZyme view
- KEGG: KEGG entry
- MetaCyc: metabolic pathway
- PRIAM: profile
- PDB structures: RCSB PDB PDBe PDBsum
Search
- PMC: articles
- PubMed: articles
- NCBI: proteins

Pyroglutamyl-peptidase II (EC 3.4.19.6, thyroliberinase, pyroglutamyl aminopeptidase II, thyrotropin-releasing factor pyroglutamate aminopeptidase, pyroglutamate aminopeptidase II, pyroglutamyl peptidase II, thyroliberin-hydrolyzing pyroglutamate aminopeptidase, thyrotropin-releasing hormone-degrading pyroglutamate aminopeptidase, thyrotropin-releasing hormone-degrading peptidase, TRH aminopeptidase) is an enzyme. This enzyme catalyses the following chemical reaction

Release of the N-terminal pyroglutamyl group from pGlu--His-Xaa tripeptides and pGlu--His-Xaa-Gly tetrapeptides

This enzyme is highly specific for thyrotropin releasing hormone.

== Human gene ==
TRHDE - thyrotropin releasing hormone degrading enzyme
