= Paracetamol poisoning =

Toxicity due to paracetamol overdose

- Other names: Acetaminophen toxicity, paracetamol toxicity, acetaminophen poisoning, paracetamol overdose, acetaminophen overdose, Tylenol toxicity
- Paracetamol
- Specialty: Toxicology
- Symptoms: Early: Non specific, feeling tired, abdominal pain, nausea Later: Yellowish skin, blood clotting problems, confusion
- Complications: Liver failure, kidney failure, pancreatitis, low blood sugar, lactic acidosis.
- Usual onset: After 24 hours (toxicity)
- Causes: Paracetamol (acetaminophen) usually > 7 g
- Risk factors: Alcoholism, malnutrition, certain other hepatotoxic medications
- Diagnostic method: Blood levels at specific times following use
- Differential diagnosis: Alcoholism, viral hepatitis, gastroenteritis
- Treatment: Activated charcoal, acetylcysteine, liver transplant
- Prognosis: Death occurs in ~0.1%
- Frequency: >100,000 per year (US)

Paracetamol poisoning, also known as acetaminophen poisoning, is caused by excessive use of the medication paracetamol (acetaminophen). Most people have few or non-specific symptoms in the first 24 hours following overdose. These symptoms include feeling tired, abdominal pain, or nausea. This is typically followed by absence of symptoms for a couple of days, after which yellowish skin, blood clotting problems, and confusion occurs as a result of liver failure. Additional complications may include kidney failure, pancreatitis, low blood sugar, and lactic acidosis. If death does not occur, people tend to recover fully over a couple of weeks. Without treatment, death from toxicity occurs 4 to 18 days later.

Paracetamol poisoning can occur accidentally or as a suicide attempt. Risk factors for toxicity include alcoholism, malnutrition, and the taking of certain other hepatotoxic medications. Liver damage results not from paracetamol itself, but from one of its metabolites, N-acetyl-p-benzoquinone imine (NAPQI). NAPQI decreases the liver's glutathione and directly damages cells in the liver. Diagnosis is based on the blood level of paracetamol at specific times after the medication was taken. These values are often plotted on the Rumack-Matthew nomogram to determine level of concern.

Treatment may include activated charcoal if the person seeks medical help soon after the overdose. Attempting to force the person to vomit is not recommended. If there is a potential for toxicity, the antidote acetylcysteine is recommended. The medication is generally given for at least 24 hours. Psychiatric care may be required following recovery. A liver transplant may be required if damage to the liver becomes severe. The need for transplant is often based on low blood pH, high blood lactate, poor blood clotting, or significant hepatic encephalopathy. With early treatment, liver failure is rare. Death occurs in about 0.1% of cases.

Paracetamol poisoning was first described in the 1960s. Rates of poisoning vary significantly between regions of the world. In the United States more than 100,000 cases occur a year. In the United Kingdom it is the medication responsible for the greatest number of overdoses. Young children are most commonly affected. In the United States and the United Kingdom, paracetamol is the most common cause of acute liver failure.

== Signs and symptoms ==
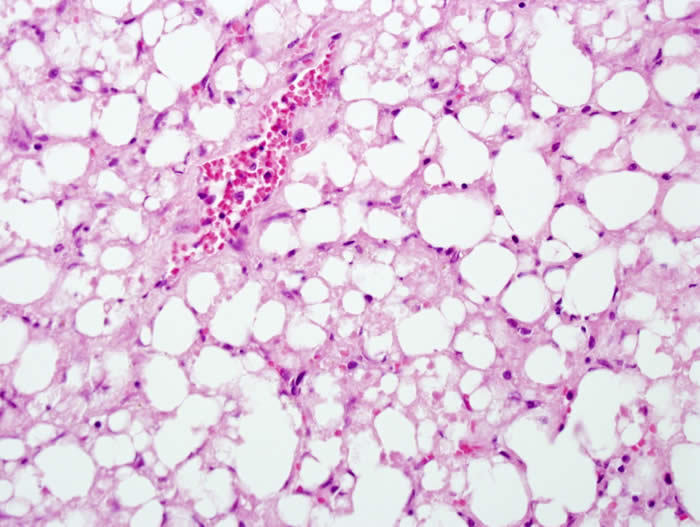
Widespread necrosis in the central venule regions of the liver acinus. Lipid droplets have merged to form lipid lakes.

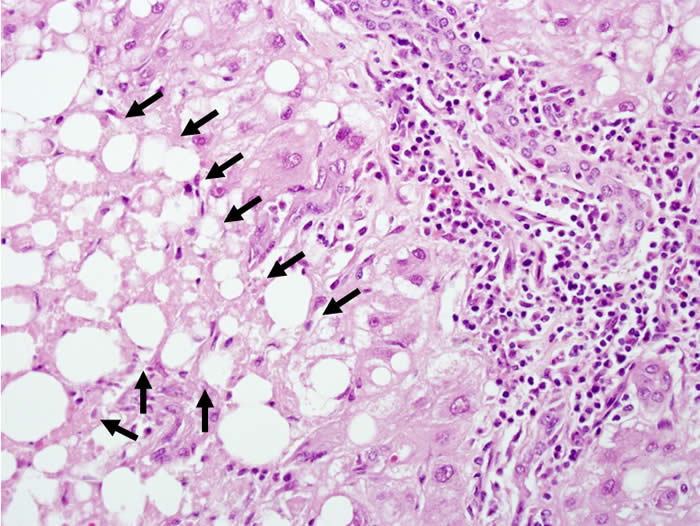
Mostly viable hepatocytes in the portal area (zone 1) of the liver acinus, with arrows pointing to a necrotic zone on the edge

These H&E pathology slides were taken from an acetaminophen poisoning case involving an adult with a history of alcohol abuse. Case contributed by Dr. Linda Ferrell, UCSF, Department of Pathology.

The signs and symptoms of paracetamol toxicity occur in three phases. The first phase begins within hours of overdose, and consists of nausea, vomiting, a pale appearance, and sweating. However, patients often have no specific symptoms or only mild symptoms in the first 24 hours of poisoning. Rarely, after massive overdoses, patients may develop symptoms of metabolic acidosis and coma early in the course of poisoning.

The second phase occurs between 24 hours and 72 hours following overdose and consists of signs of increasing liver damage. In general, damage occurs in liver cells as they metabolize the paracetamol. Hallmark pathology on liver biopsy includes regions of coagulative necrosis in zone 3 of the liver acinus, around the central venules, as these hepatocytes have higher concentrations of cytochrome P450 enzymes compared to zone 1 hepatocytes surrounding the portal venule of the acinus. Remaining viable hepatocytes frequently show ballooning injury and steatosis. The individual may experience right upper quadrant abdominal pain. The increasing liver damage also changes biochemical markers of liver function; International normalized ratio (INR) and the liver transaminases ALT and AST rise to abnormal levels. Acute kidney failure may also occur during this phase, typically caused by either hepatorenal syndrome or multiple organ dysfunction syndrome. In some cases, acute kidney failure may be the primary clinical manifestation of toxicity. In these cases, it has been suggested that the toxic metabolite is produced more in the kidneys than in the liver.

The third phase follows at 3 to 5 days, and is marked by complications of massive liver necrosis leading to fulminant liver failure with complications of coagulation defects, low blood sugar, kidney failure, hepatic encephalopathy, brain swelling, sepsis, multiple organ failure, and death. If the third phase is survived, the liver necrosis runs its course, and liver and kidney function typically return to normal in a few weeks. The severity of paracetamol toxicity varies depending on the dose and whether appropriate treatment is received.

== Cause ==
The toxic dose of paracetamol is highly variable. In general the recommended maximum daily dose for healthy adults is 4 grams. Higher doses lead to increasing risk of toxicity. In adults, single doses above 10 grams or 200 mg/kg of bodyweight, whichever is lower, have a reasonable likelihood of causing toxicity. Toxicity can also occur when multiple smaller doses within 24 hours exceed these levels. Following a dose of 1 gram of paracetamol four times a day for two weeks, patients can expect an increase in alanine transaminase in their liver to typically about three times the normal value. It is unlikely that this dose would lead to liver failure. Studies have shown significant hepatotoxicity is uncommon in patients who have taken greater than normal doses over 3 to 4 days. In adults, a dose of 6 grams a day over the preceding 48 hours could potentially lead to toxicity, while in children acute doses above 200 mg/kg could potentially cause toxicity. Acute paracetamol overdose in children rarely causes illness or death, and it is very uncommon for children to have levels that require treatment, with chronic larger-than-normal doses being the major cause of toxicity in children.

Intentional overdosing (self-poisoning, with suicidal intent) is frequently implicated in paracetamol toxicity. In a 2006 review, paracetamol was the most frequently ingested compound in intentional overdosing.

In rare individuals, paracetamol toxicity can result from normal use. This may be due to individual ("idiosyncratic") differences in the expression and activity of certain enzymes in one of the metabolic pathways that handle paracetamol (see paracetamol's metabolism).

=== Risk factors ===
A number of factors can potentially increase the risk of developing paracetamol toxicity. Chronic excessive alcohol consumption can induce CYP2E1, thus increasing the potential toxicity of paracetamol. In one study of patients with liver injury, 64% reported alcohol intakes of greater than 80 grams a day, while 35% took 60 grams a day or less. Whether chronic alcoholism should be considered a risk factor has been debated by some clinical toxicologists. For chronic alcohol users, acute alcohol ingestion at the time of a paracetamol overdose may have a protective effect. For non-chronic alcohol users, acute alcohol consumption had no protective effect.

Fasting is a risk factor, possibly because of depletion of liver glutathione reserves. The concomitant use of the CYP2E1 inducer isoniazid increases the risk of hepatotoxicity, though whether 2E1 induction is related to the hepatotoxicity in this case is unclear. Concomitant use of other drugs that induce CYP enzymes, such as antiepileptics including carbamazepine, phenytoin, and barbiturates, have also been reported as risk factors.

== Pathophysiology ==
Main pathways of paracetamol metabolism (click to enlarge). The pathway leading to NAPQI is shown in red.

When taken in normal therapeutic doses, paracetamol has been shown to be safe. Following a therapeutic dose, it is mostly converted to nontoxic metabolites via Phase II metabolism by conjugation with sulfate and glucuronide, with a small portion being oxidized via the cytochrome P450 enzyme system. Cytochromes P450 2E1 and 3A4 convert approximately 5% of paracetamol to a highly reactive intermediary metabolite, N-acetyl-p-benzoquinone imine (NAPQI). Under normal conditions, NAPQI is detoxified by conjugation with glutathione to form cysteine and mercapturic acid conjugates.

In cases of paracetamol overdose, the sulfate and glucuronide pathways become saturated, and more paracetamol is shunted to the cytochrome P450 system to produce NAPQI. As a result, hepatocellular supplies of glutathione become depleted, as the demand for glutathione is higher than its regeneration. NAPQI therefore remains in its toxic form in the liver and reacts with cellular membrane molecules, resulting in widespread hepatocyte damage and death, leading to acute liver necrosis. In animal studies, the liver's stores of glutathione must be depleted to less than 70% of normal levels before liver toxicity occurs.

== Diagnosis ==
Rumack–Matthew nomogram with treatment line added at 150

A person's history of taking paracetamol is somewhat accurate for the diagnosis. The most effective way to diagnose poisoning is by obtaining a blood paracetamol level. A drug nomogram developed in 1975, called the Rumack–Matthew nomogram, estimates the risk of toxicity based on the serum concentration of paracetamol at a given number of hours after ingestion. To determine the risk of potential hepatotoxicity, the paracetamol level is traced along the nomogram. Use of a timed serum paracetamol level plotted on the nomogram appears to be the best marker indicating the potential for liver injury. A paracetamol level drawn in the first four hours after ingestion may underestimate the amount in the system because paracetamol may still be in the process of being absorbed from the gastrointestinal tract. Therefore, a serum level taken before 4 hours is not recommended.

Clinical or biochemical evidence of liver toxicity may develop in one to four days, although, in severe cases, it may be evident in 12 hours. Right-upper-quadrant tenderness may be present and can aid in diagnosis. Laboratory studies may show evidence of liver necrosis with elevated AST, ALT, bilirubin, and prolonged coagulation times, particularly an elevated prothrombin time. After paracetamol overdose, when AST and ALT exceed 1000 IU/L, paracetamol-induced hepatotoxicity can be diagnosed. In some cases, the AST and ALT levels can exceed 10,000 IU/L.

=== Detection in body fluids ===
Paracetamol may be quantified in blood, plasma, or urine as a diagnostic tool in clinical poisoning situations or to aid in the medicolegal investigation of suspicious deaths. The concentration in serum after a typical dose of paracetamol usually peaks below 30 mg/L, which equals 200 μmol/L. Levels of 30–300 mg/L (200–2000 μmol/L) are often observed in overdose patients. Postmortem blood levels have ranged from 50 to 400 mg/L in persons dying due to acute overdosage. Automated colorimetric techniques, gas chromatography and liquid chromatography are currently in use for the laboratory analysis of the drug in physiological specimens.

== Prevention ==
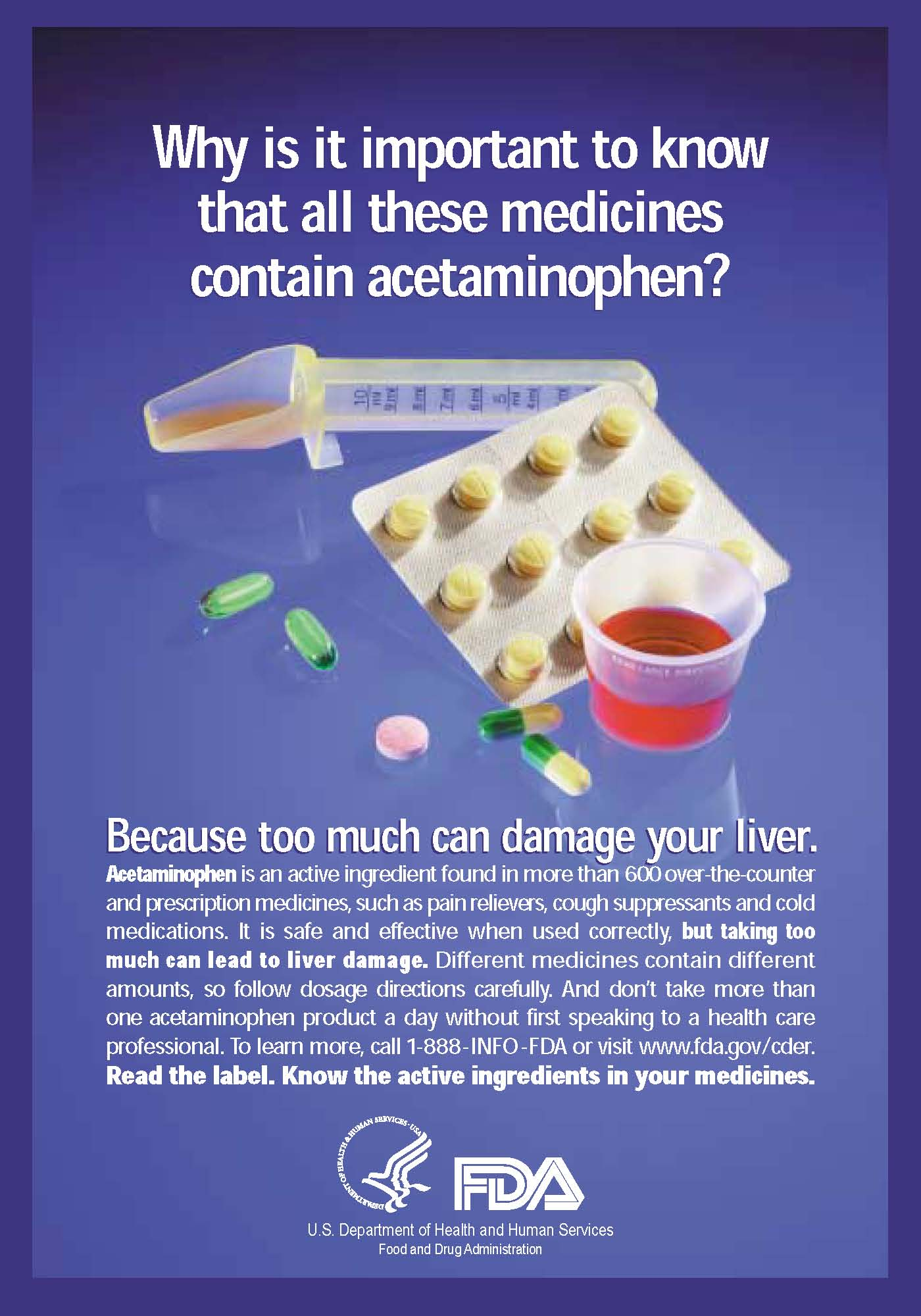
Awareness poster on acetaminophen abuse

=== Limitation of availability ===
Limiting the availability of paracetamol tablets has been attempted in some countries. In the UK, sales of over-the-counter paracetamol are restricted to packs of 32 × 500 mg tablets in pharmacies, and 16 × 500 mg tablets in non-pharmacy outlets. Pharmacists may provide up to 100 tablets for those with chronic conditions at the pharmacist's discretion. In Ireland, the limits are 24 and 12 tablets, respectively. Subsequent study suggests that the reduced availability in large numbers had a significant effect in reducing poisoning deaths from paracetamol overdose.

One suggested method of prevention is to make paracetamol a prescription-only medicine, or to remove it entirely from the market. However, overdose is a relatively minor problem; for example, 0.08% of the UK population (over 50 thousand people) present with paracetamol overdose each year. In contrast, paracetamol is a safe and effective medication that is taken without complications by millions of people. In addition, alternative pain relief medications such as aspirin are more toxic in overdose, whereas non-steroidal anti-inflammatory drugs are associated with more adverse effects following normal use.

=== Combination with other agents ===
One strategy for reducing harm done by acetaminophen overdoses is selling paracetamol pre-combined in tablets either with an emetic or an antidote. Paradote was a tablet sold in the UK which combined 500 mg paracetamol with 100 mg methionine, an amino acid formerly used in the treatment of paracetamol overdose.

There have been no studies so far on the effectiveness of paracetamol when given in combination with its most commonly used antidote, acetylcysteine.

Calcitriol, the active metabolite of vitamin D_{3}, appears to be a catalyst for glutathione production. Calcitriol was found to increase glutathione levels in rat astrocyte primary cultures on average by 42%, increasing glutathione protein concentrations from 29 nmol/mg to 41 nmol/mg, 24 and 48 hours after administration; it continued to have an influence on glutathione levels 96 hours after administration. It has been proposed that co-administration of calcitriol, via injection, may improve treatment outcomes.

=== Paracetamol replacements ===
Paracetamol ester prodrug containing L-pyroglutamic acid (PGA), a biosynthetic precursor of glutathione, has been synthesized to reduce paracetamol hepatotoxicity and improve bioavailability. The toxicological studies of different paracetamol esters show that L-5-oxo-pyrrolidine-2-paracetamol carboxylate reduces toxicity after administration of an overdose of paracetamol to mice. The liver glutathione values in mice induced by intraperitoneal injection of the ester are superimposable with the GSH levels recorded in untreated mice control group. The mice group treated with an equivalent dose of paracetamol showed a significant decrease of glutathione of 35% (p<0.01 vs untreated control group). The oral LD50 was found to be greater than 2000 mg kg-1, whereas the intraperitoneal LD50 was 1900 mg kg-1. These results taken together with the good hydrolysis and bioavailability data show that this ester is a potential candidate as a prodrug of paracetamol.

== Treatment ==
=== Gastrointestinal decontamination ===
In adults, the initial treatment for paracetamol overdose is gastrointestinal decontamination. Paracetamol absorption from the gastrointestinal tract is complete within two hours under normal circumstances, so decontamination is most helpful if performed within this timeframe. Gastric lavage, better known as stomach pumping, may be considered if the amount ingested is potentially life-threatening and the procedure can be performed within 60 minutes of ingestion. Administration of activated charcoal is the most common gastrointestinal decontamination procedure as it efficiently adsorbs paracetamol, thereby reducing its gastrointestinal absorption. Administering activated charcoal also poses less risk of aspiration than gastric lavage.

It appears that the most benefit from activated charcoal is gained if it is given within 30 minutes to two hours of ingestion. Administering activated charcoal later than 2 hours can be considered in patients that may have delayed gastric emptying due to co-ingested drugs or following ingestion of sustained- or delayed-release paracetamol preparations. Activated charcoal should also be administered if co-ingested drugs warrant decontamination. There was reluctance to give activated charcoal in paracetamol overdose, because of the concern that it may also absorb the oral antidote acetylcysteine. Studies have shown that 39% less acetylcysteine is absorbed into the body when they are administered together. There are conflicting recommendations regarding whether to change the dosing of oral acetylcysteine after the administration of activated charcoal, and even whether the dosing of acetylcysteine needs to be altered at all. Intravenous acetylcysteine has no interaction with activated charcoal.

Inducing vomiting with syrup of ipecac has no role in paracetamol overdose because the vomiting it induces delays the effective administration of activated charcoal and oral acetylcysteine. Liver injury is extremely rare after acute accidental ingestion in children under 6 years of age. Children with accidental exposures do not require gastrointestinal decontamination with either gastric lavage, activated charcoal, or syrup of ipecac.

=== Acetylcysteine ===
Acetylcysteine is the antidote for paracetamol toxicity.

Acetylcysteine, also called N-acetylcysteine or NAC, works to reduce paracetamol toxicity by replenishing body stores of the antioxidant glutathione. Glutathione reacts with the toxic NAPQI metabolite so that it does not damage cells and can be safely excreted. NAC is usually given following a treatment nomogram for patients with an acute overdose at a known time of ingestion. Patients with unknown time of ingestion, unreliable history, or repeat supratherapeutic ingestion are treated based on risk assessment. Cysteamine and methionine have also been used to prevent hepatotoxicity, although studies show that both are associated with more adverse effects than acetylcysteine. Additionally, acetylcysteine has been shown to be a more effective antidote, particularly in patients presenting greater than 8 hours post-ingestion and for those who present with liver failure symptoms.

If the person presents less than eight hours after paracetamol overdose, then acetylcysteine significantly reduces the risk of serious hepatotoxicity and guarantees survival. If acetylcysteine is started more than 8 hours after ingestion, there is a sharp decline in its effectiveness because the cascade of toxic events in the liver has already begun, and the risk of acute liver necrosis and death increases dramatically. Although acetylcysteine is most effective if given early, it still has beneficial effects if given as late as 48 hours after ingestion. If the person presents more than eight hours after the paracetamol overdose, then activated charcoal is not useful, and acetylcysteine is started immediately. In earlier presentations, charcoal can be given when the patient arrives and acetylcysteine is initiated while waiting for the paracetamol level results to return from the laboratory.

In United States practice, intravenous (IV) and oral administration are considered to be equally effective and safe if given within 8 hours of ingestion. However, IV is the only recommended route in Australasian and British practice. Oral acetylcysteine is given as a 140 mg/kg loading dose followed by 70 mg/kg every four hours for 17 more doses, and if the patient vomits within 1 hour of dose, the dose must be repeated. Oral acetylcysteine may be poorly tolerated due to its unpleasant taste, odor, and its tendency to cause nausea and vomiting. If repeated doses of charcoal are indicated because of another ingested drug, then subsequent doses of charcoal and acetylcysteine should be staggered.

Intravenous acetylcysteine is given as a continuous infusion over 20 hours for a total dose 300 mg/kg. Recommended administration involves infusion of a 150 mg/kg loading dose over 15 to 60 minutes, followed by a 50 mg/kg infusion over four hours; the last 100 mg/kg are infused over the remaining 16 hours of the protocol. Intravenous acetylcysteine has the advantage of shortening hospital stay, increasing both doctor and patient convenience, and allowing administration of activated charcoal to reduce absorption of both the paracetamol and any co-ingested drugs without concerns about interference with oral acetylcysteine. Intravenous dosing varies with weight, specifically in children. For patients less than 20 kg, the loading dose is 150 mg/kg in 3 mL/kg diluent, administered over 60 minutes; the second dose is 50 mg/kg in 7 mL/kg diluent over 4 hours; and the third and final dose is 100 mg/kg in 14 mL/kg diluent over 16 hours. Because of the risk of adverse events, electrolyte derangements and fluid shifts associated with larger doses of acetylcysteine dose capping regimens have been suggested. To date no increased risk of hepatic injury or failure has been noted with this dose capping strategy.

The most common adverse effect to acetylcysteine treatment is an anaphylactoid reaction, usually manifested by rash, wheeze, or mild hypotension. Adverse reactions are more common in people treated with IV acetylcysteine, occurring in up to 20% of patients. Anaphylactoid reactions are more likely to occur with the first infusion (the loading dose). Rarely, severe life-threatening reactions may occur in predisposed individuals, such as patients with asthma or atopic dermatitis, and may be characterized by respiratory distress, facial swelling, and even death.

If an anaphylactoid reaction occurs the acetylcysteine is temporarily halted or slowed and antihistamines and other supportive care is administered. For example, a nebulised beta-agonist like salbutamol may be indicated in the event of significant bronchospasm (or prophylactically in patients with a history of bronchospasm secondary to acetylcysteine). It is also important to closely monitor fluids and electrolytes.

=== Liver transplant ===
In people who develop acute liver failure or who are otherwise expected to die from liver failure, the mainstay of management is liver transplantation. Liver transplants are performed in specialist centers. The most commonly used criteria for liver transplant were developed by physicians at King's College Hospital in London. Patients are recommended for transplant if they have an arterial blood pH less than 7.3 after fluid resuscitation or if a patient has Grade III or IV encephalopathy, a prothrombin time greater than 100 seconds, and a serum creatinine greater than 300 mmol/L In a 24-hour period. Other forms of liver support have been used including partial liver transplants. These techniques have the advantage of supporting the patient while their own liver regenerates. Once liver function returns immunosuppressive drugs are commenced and they have to take immunosuppressive medication for the rest of their lives.

== Prognosis ==
The mortality rate from paracetamol overdose increases two days after the ingestion, reaches a maximum on day four, and then gradually decreases. Acidosis is the most important single indicator of probable mortality and the need for transplantation. A mortality rate of 95% without transplant was reported in patients who had a documented pH less than 7.30. Other indicators of poor prognosis include chronic kidney disease (stage 3 or worse), hepatic encephalopathy, a markedly elevated prothrombin time, or an elevated blood lactic acid level (lactic acidosis). One study has shown that a factor V level less than 10% of normal indicated a poor prognosis (91% mortality), whereas a ratio of factor VIII to factor V of less than 30 indicated a good prognosis (100% survival). Patients with a poor prognosis are usually identified for likely liver transplantation. Patients that do not die are expected to fully recover and have a normal life expectancy and quality of life. Fertility may deteriorate. There is evidence of acetaminophen gonadotoxicity and a persistent negative effect of poisoning on the ability to conceive due to deterioration in sperm quality (impaired sperm morphology) in a previously healthy person.

== Epidemiology ==
Many over-the-counter and prescription-only medications contain paracetamol. Because of its wide availability paired with comparably high toxicity, (compared to ibuprofen and aspirin) there is a much higher potential for overdose. Paracetamol toxicity is one of the most common causes of poisoning worldwide. In the United States, the United Kingdom, Australia, and New Zealand, paracetamol is the most common cause of drug overdoses. Additionally, in both the United States and the United Kingdom it is the most common cause of acute liver failure.

In England and Wales an estimated 41,200 cases of paracetamol poisoning occurred in 1989 to 1990, with a mortality of 0.40%. It is estimated that 150 to 200 deaths and 15 to 20 liver transplants occur as a result of poisoning each year in England and Wales. Paracetamol overdose results in more calls to poison control centers in the US than overdose of any other pharmacological substance, accounting for more than 100,000 calls, as well as 56,000 emergency room visits, 2,600 hospitalizations, and 458 deaths due to acute liver failure per year. A study of cases of acute liver failure between November 2000 and October 2004 by the Centers for Disease Control and Prevention in the US found that paracetamol was the cause of 41% of all cases in adults, and 25% of cases in children.
