= Pyroglutamic acid =

Names
- Preferred IUPAC name 5-Oxoproline
- Systematic IUPAC name 5-Oxopyrrolidine-2-carboxylic acid
- Other names: 2-Pyrrolidone-5-carboxylic acid; Pidolic acid; 5-Oxo-proline

Identifiers
CAS Number	149-87-1 (R/S); 4042-36-8 (R); 98-79-3 (S)
3D model (JSmol)	Interactive image
Abbreviations	Glp
Beilstein Reference	82134
ChEBI	CHEBI:16010 (R/S); CHEBI:16924 (R); CHEBI:18183 (S)
ChEMBL	ChEMBL284718
ChemSpider	485 (R/S); 388752 (R); 7127 (S)
DrugBank	DB03088
ECHA InfoCard	100.005.227
EC Number	205-748-3
Gmelin Reference	1473408
IUPHAR/BPS	4703
KEGG	C02237
MeSH	Pyrrolidonecarboxylic+acid
PubChem CID	499 (R/S); 439685 (R); 7405 (S)
RTECS number	TW3710000
UNII	6VT1YZM21H (R/S); SZB83O1W42 (S)
CompTox Dashboard (EPA)	DTXSID80859174
- InChI: InChI=1S/C5H7NO3/c7-4-2-1-3(6-4)5(8)9/h3H,1-2H2,(H,6,7)(H,8,9) Key: ODHCTXKNWHHXJC-UHFFFAOYSA-N; InChI=1S/C5H7NO3/c7-4-2-1-3(6-4)5(8)9/h3H,1-2H2,(H,6,7)(H,8,9)/t3-/m0/s1; InChI=1S/C5H7NO3/c7-4-2-1-3(6-4)5(8)9/h3H,1-2H2,(H,6,7)(H,8,9)/t3-/m0/s1 Key: ODHCTXKNWHHXJC-VKHMYHEASA-N
- SMILES: O=C(O)[C@H]1NC(=O)CC1

Properties
Chemical formula	C_{5}H_{7}NO_{3}
Molar mass	129.115 g·mol^{−1}
Melting point	184 °C (363 °F; 457 K)
log P	−0.89
Acidity (pK_{a})	−1.76, 3.48, 12.76
Basicity (pK_{b})	15.76, 10.52, 1.24
Isoelectric point	0.94

Related compounds
Related compounds	proline 2-Pyrrolidone
- Except where otherwise noted, data are given for materials in their standard state (at 25 °C [77 °F], 100 kPa). verify (what is ?) Infobox references

Pyroglutamic acid (also known as PCA, 5-oxoproline, pidolic acid) is a ubiquitous but understudied natural amino acid derivative in which the free amino group of glutamic acid or glutamine cyclizes to form a lactam. The names of pyroglutamic acid conjugate base, anion, salts, and esters are pyroglutamate, 5-oxoprolinate, or pidolate.

Formation of pyroglutamic acid from N-terminal glutamine.

It is a metabolite in the glutathione cycle that is converted to glutamate by 5-oxoprolinase. Pyroglutamate is found in many proteins including bacteriorhodopsin. N-terminal glutamic acid and glutamine residues can spontaneously cyclize to become pyroglutamate, or enzymatically converted by glutaminyl cyclases. This is one of several forms of blocked N-termini which present a problem for N-terminal sequencing using Edman chemistry, which requires a free primary amino group not present in pyroglutamic acid. The enzyme pyroglutamate aminopeptidase can restore a free N-terminus by cleaving off the pyroglutamate residue.

Pyroglutamic acid exists as two distinct enantiomers:

- (2R) or D which happens to be (+) or d
- (2S) or L which happens to be (–) or l

== Metabolism ==
As first discovered in 1882, pyroglutamic acid can be formed by heating glutamic acid at 180 °C, which results in the loss of a molecule of water. In living cells, it is derived from glutathione through the action of an enzyme, γ-glutamyl cyclotransferase. Pyroglutamic acid may function in glutamate storage, and acts to oppose the action of glutamate, including in the brain. It also acts on the brain's cholinergic system; Amyloid β containing pyroglutamic acid is increased in Alzheimer's disease; this may be part of the disease process.

Increased levels of pyroglutamic acid in the blood, leading to excess in the urine (5-oxoprolinuria), can occur following paracetamol overdose, as well as in certain inborn errors of metabolism, causing high anion gap metabolic acidosis.

Pyroglutamic acid is a natural humectant in skin, and part of its natural moisturizing factor (NMF).

Pyroglutamic acid is also present as the N-terminal amino acid in orexin-A, a peptide involved in wakefulness, among other things.

== Uses ==
The sodium salt of pyroglutamic acid—known either as sodium pyroglutamate, sodium PCA, or sodium pidolate—is used for dry skin and hair products, as it is a humectant. It has low toxicity and is not a skin irritant, but its use in products is limited by a high price.

L-pyroglutamic acid is sold online as a nootropic dietary supplement.

Magnesium pidolate, the magnesium salt of pyroglutamic acid, is found in some mineral supplements.

In a preclinical study, additional pharmacological properties of pyroglutamic acid were revealed such as anti-phosphodiesterase type 5, anti-angiotensin-converting enzyme, and anti-urease activities.
