= Aminoacyltransferase =

Class of enzymes

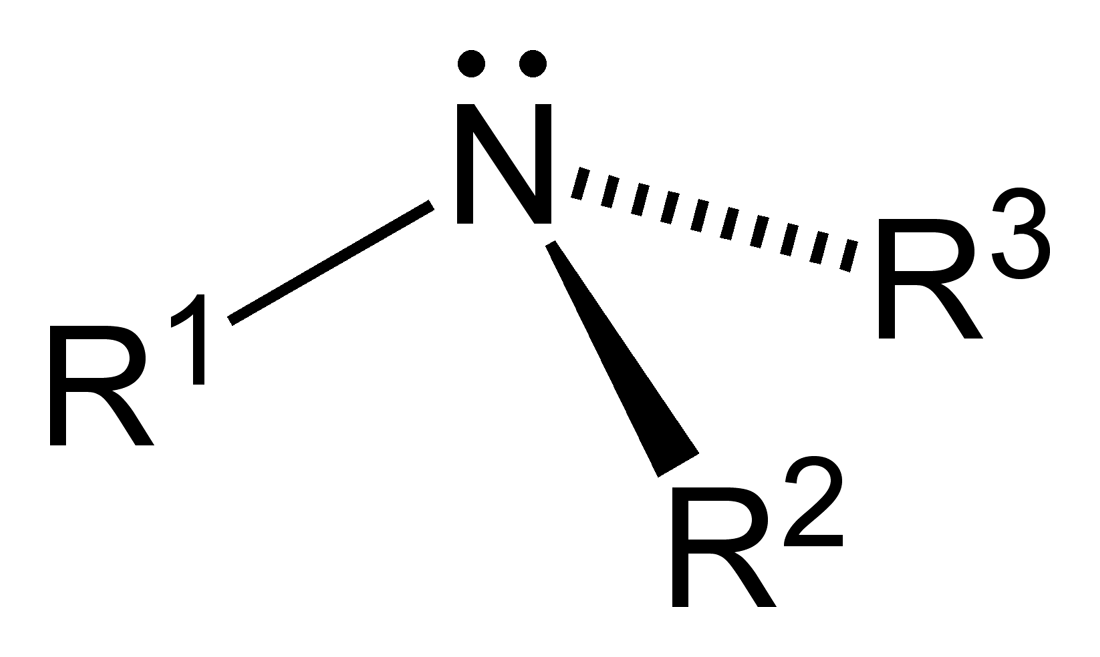
The general structure of an amine

Aminoacyltransferases (EC 2.3.2) are acyltransferase enzymes which act upon an amino group. For instance, aminoacyl tRNA synthetases attach an aminoacid through esterification to the corresponding tRNA. The activation of amino acids it aminoacyl-tRNA synthetase requires hydrolysis of ATP to AMP plus PP_{i}. The aminoacyl-tRNA molecule has close relationships with elongation factors like EF-Tu.

Peptidyl transferases are also a type of aminoacyltransferase that catalyze the formation of peptide bonds, as well as the hydrolytic step that leads to the release of newly synthesized proteins off the tRNA.
