= Steven Seifert =

American medical toxicologist

Steven A. Seifert
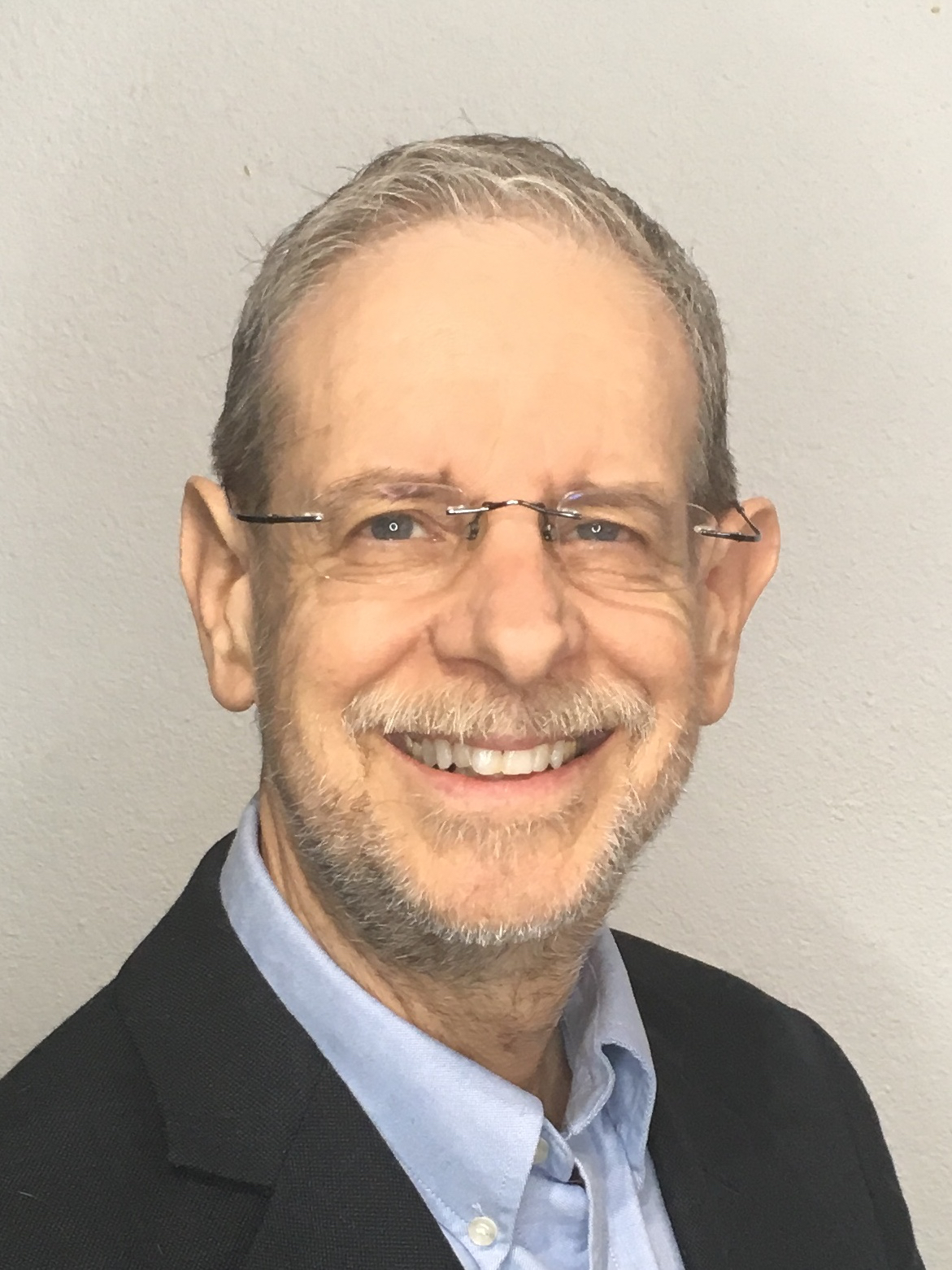
- Born: Steven Alan Seifert; February 27, 1950 (age 76); Brooklyn, New York, U.S.A.
- Died: May 18, 2022 (aged 72); Albuquerque, New Mexico, U.S.A.
- Education: Cornell University (BS); University of Cincinnati (MD); University of Arizona (Certificate); University of Colorado (Certificate); University of Chicago (Certificate)
- Occupations: Medical toxicologist, professor, poison center medical director, journal editor, musician
- Years active: 1976–2022

Steven A. Seifert (1950–2022) was an American medical toxicologist. He was a professor of emergency medicine at the University of New Mexico, as well as the medical director of the New Mexico Poison and Drug Information Center. Since 2017, he was the editor-in-chief of Clinical Toxicology. He was also a jazz tenor saxophonist.

== Education ==
Seifert received his B.S., with Honors and with Distinction, from Cornell University in 1972 and his M.D. from the University of Cincinnati in 1976. He completed his internship in family medicine at the University of Arizona, his fellowship in medical toxicology at the University of Colorado and received an advanced certificate in medical writing and editing from the University of Chicago.

== Medical career ==
After his initial training, Seifert practiced emergency medicine from 1977 to 2001 and was certified by the American Board of Emergency Medicine, maintaining that certification for 30 years. After completing his Medical Toxicology fellowship, Seifert served on the staff of the Arizona Poison and Drug Information Center in Tucson, after which he served as the medical director of the Nebraska Poison Center in Omaha. In 2003, he helped to save the Nebraska Poison Center from closure, moving it into the University of Nebraska Medical Center, and became the inaugural Medical Director of the reborn Nebraska Regional Poison Center. In 2005, he developed and chaired “Snakebites in the New Millennium,” a progenitor meeting of the Venom Week Symposiums. He also chaired Venom Week III in 2009 and co-chaired the combined Venom Week IV/International Society on Toxinology meeting in 2012. In 2006, under a DHHS/HRSA Grant, he was part of the team that created the web-based Antivenom Index, a resource for zoos to document their holdings of antivenoms to non-native species and for clinicians to locate those antivenoms to treat exotic envenomations. In 2007, he became the Medical Director of the New Mexico Poison and Drug Information Center. Much of Seifert's academic work has been in the field of envenomations and antivenoms. He was an investigator in a number of clinical trials of antivenoms that resulted in FDA-licensed pharmaceuticals. He has over 200 peer-reviewed, scientific publications including a review of snake envenomations in the New England Journal of Medicine, and medical textbook chapters, including in Goldman-Cecil Medicine, Critical Care Toxicology, Conn's Current Therapy, UpToDate, and Medical Toxicology, 3e (Lippincott Williams & Wilkins) He co-edited Clinical Toxinology in Australia, Europe and Americas (Springer). He also served on the New Mexico Prescription Drug Misuse and Overdose Prevention and Pain Management Advisory Council as the statutory representative of the University of New Mexico. Seifert has served as a guest editor of Toxicon. He was appointed to the senior editorial board of Clinical Toxicology in 2008, as an associate editor in 2014, and as editor in chief in 2017.

== Honors and awards ==
Seifert was a Fellow of the American Academy of Clinical Toxicology, of the American College of Medical Toxicology, and of the European Association of Poisons Centres and Clinical Toxicologists. He previously was elected as a Fellow of the American College of Emergency Physicians. He has served on the Boards of Directors of the American College of Medical Toxicology, the American Association of Poison Control Centers, and the North American Society of Toxinology (NAST), including as NAST's inaugural Board President. In 1996 he received a JCPenney Golden Rule Finalist Award, an Arizona Governor's Recognition Award, and a subsequent U.S. Presidential Service Award nomination for his work with victims of sexual assault. He received the Distinguished Alumni Award from the University of Cincinnati College of Medicine in 2011, the Presidential Merit Award from the American Academy of Clinical Toxicology in 2018, the Volunteer Faculty Award of the University of New Mexico College of Pharmacy in 2019, and the Matthew J. Ellenhorn Career Achievement Award of the American College of Medical Toxicology, in 2022.

== Selected peer-reviewed medical publications ==
- Seifert, SA.; Boyer, LV. (2001). "Recurrence phenomena after immunoglobulin therapy for snake envenomations: Part 1. Pharmacokinetics and pharmacodynamics of immunoglobulin antivenoms and related antibodies". Annals of Emergency Medicine. 37 (2): 189–195. doi:10.1067/mem.2001.113135. PMID 11174238.
- Dart, RC.; Seifert, SA.; Boyer, LV.; et al. (2001). "A randomized multicenter trial of crotalinae polyvalent immune fab (Ovine) antivenom for the treatment for crotaline snakebite in the United States". Archives of Internal Medicine. 161 (16): 2030–2036. doi:10.1001/archinte.161.16.2030. PMID 11525706.
- Seifert, SA.; Boyer, LV.; Benson, BE.; et al. (2009). "AAPCC database characterization of native US venomous snake exposures, 2001-2005". Clinical Toxicology. 47 (4): 327–335. doi:10.1080/15563650902870277. PMID 19514880. S2CID 205902204.
- Seifert, SM.; Seifert, SA.; Schaechter, JL.; et al. (2013). "An analysis of energy-drink toxicity in the National Poison Data System". Clinical Toxicology. 51 (7): 566–574. doi:10.3109/15563650.2013.820310. PMID 23879181. S2CID 21436675.
- Bush, S.; Ruha, AM.; Seifert, SA.; et al. (2015). "Comparison of F(ab')2 versus Fab antivenom for pit viper envenomation: A prospective, blinded, multicenter, randomized clinical trial". Clinical Toxicology. 53 (1): 37–45. doi:10.3109/15563650.2014.974263. PMC 4364250. PMID 25361165.
- Seifert, SA.; Kirschner, R.; Martin, TG.; et al. (2015). "Acetaminophen concentrations prior to 4 hours of ingestion: Impact on diagnostic decision-making and treatment". Clinical Toxicology. 53 (7): 618–623. doi:10.3109/15563650.2015.1059942. PMID 26107627. S2CID 28768556.
- Fletcher, ML; Preeyaporn, S; Nash, J; Smoinske, S; Alunday, RL; Seifert, SA; Warrick, BJ (2021). "A Systematic Review of Second line Therapies in Toxic Seizures". Clinical Toxicology. 59 (6): 451–456. doi:10.1080/15563650.2021.1894332. PMID 33755521. S2CID 232337974.
- Seifert, SA; Armitage, JO; Sanchez, EE (2022). "Snake Envenomation". New England Journal of Medicine. 386 (January 6): 68–78. doi:10.1056/NEJMra2105228. PMC 9854269. PMID 34986287. S2CID 245771267.

== Other published work ==
Seifert has published non-medical works of scientific research, as well as humor and fiction, including: "On Batting Order" in the Baseball Research Journal (1994; 23: 101-105), the official journal of the Society for American Baseball Research, "Sherlock Holmes: Academic Toxicologist" in the Baker Street Journal (2001; 51, no. 1: 23-27), the official journal of The Baker Street Irregulars, "The Cheap Romantic" in the Tucson Weekly (11/11/92), and "For the Birds" in Tucson Lifestyle Magazine (7/95), among others.

== Other accomplishments ==
Seifert was a bicyclist, having ridden in bicycle races and events at distances between 25 miles to greater than 100 miles. Seifert was also a jazz, tenor saxophonist who, since 2012, had performed regularly in the "Arts-in-Medicine" concert series at the University of New Mexico Hospital and other venues with his combo, "Once Again." Both he and his combo were featured in the May, 2021 issue of "Albuquerque, The Magazine". In 2020, he became a founding member of "The Steve Seifert Project", a virtual music group whose members are all named, "Steve Seifert" including the Nashville dulcimer player, Steve Seifert and the Los Angeles bassist, Steve Seifert.
