= Redi Award =

Redi Award is an international science award given to scientists who have made significant contributions in toxinology, the scientific study of venoms, poisons and toxins. The award is sponsored by the International Society on Toxinology (ISI).

== Origin ==
Osservazioni intorno alle vipere (Observations about the Viper) written by an Italian polymath Francesco Redi in 1664 is regarded as the milestone in the beginning of toxinology research. Redi was the first scientist to elucidate the scientific basis of snakebite and venom of the viper. He showed for the first time that the viper venom comes from the fang, not the gallbladder as it was believed; that it is not poisonous when swallowed, and effective only when it enters the bloodstream. He even demonstrated the possibility of slowing down the venom action in the blood by tight ligature before the wound. This work is heralded as the foundation of toxinology. In honour of the pioneer, the International Society on Toxinology (ISI) instituted the Redi Award in 1967 in recognition of scientists for their significant contributions in toxinology research.

== Nature of the award ==
The IST awards scientists or clinicians who have made outstanding contributions to the field of toxinology. The award is given at each World Congress of the Society, which is generally held every three years. It is the highest award bestowed by the society and the most prestigious in the world for toxinologists. Selection for the award is made by the Redi Award Committee chaired by the editor of Toxicon (the official journal of IST) and accompanied by past and present Executive Officers of the society and former Redi awardees. The result is only announced at the World Congress. The recipient is then invited to present a lecture of his/her own choosing, officially called the Redi Lecture, to the congress. The Award consists of a framed citation describing the merits of the awardee and a financial assistance to help cover expenses associated with attendance at the meeting.

== Recipients ==
The inaugural award was presented in 1967.

- Findlay E. Russell (USA) 1967
- Paul Boquet (France) 1970
- André de Vries (South Africa) 1974
- Chen-Yuan Lee (Taiwan) 1976
- Hugh Alistair Reid (UK) 1979
- Nobuo Tamiya (Japan) 1982
- Philip Rosenberg (USA) 1982
- Sherman A. Minton (USA) 1985
- Paul A Christensen (South Africa) 1988
- Ernst Habermann (Germany) 1991
- Elazar Kochva (Israel) 1994
- Evert Karlsson (Sweden) 1997
- Alan Harvey (UK) 2000
- Andre Menez (France) 2000
- Baldomero Olivera (USA) 2003
- Lourival Possani (Mexico) 2006
- Cesare Montecucco (Italy) 2009
- David A Warrell (UK) 2012
- José María Gutiérrez (toxinologist) (Costa Rica) 2015
- Michel Lazdunski (France) 2017
- Dietrich Mebs (Germany) 2017

== See also ==
- List of biology awards
