= José María Gutiérrez (toxinologist) =

Costa Rican toxinologist

José María Gutiérrez Gutiérrez (born 17 November 1954) is a Costa Rican microbiologist and emeritus professor at the University of Costa Rica. His research focuses on the biochemistry, immunology, and pathology of snake venoms, particularly the mechanisms through which venom toxins cause tissue damage. He has also studied the effectiveness of antivenoms, contributed to the development and evaluation of antivenom treatments, and worked on the public-health challenges associated with snakebite envenoming. Gutiérrez has held academic and leadership positions at the university's Clodomiro Picado Institute and has advised the World Health Organization and the Pan American Health Organization on antivenoms

== Early life and education ==
Gutiérrez studied microbiology and clinical chemistry at the University of Costa Rica, where he received his degree in 1977. While an undergraduate, he began working as a research assistant at the university's Clodomiro Picado Institute in 1975. His early research included the study of the karyotypes of venomous snakes, before he turned to the pathological effects of snake venoms and the development of antivenoms. From 1980 to 1984, Gutiérrez pursued doctoral studies in physiological sciences at Oklahoma State University in the United States. Under the supervision of Charlotte L. Ownby, he isolated a myotoxic phospholipase A₂ from the venom of Bothrops asper, a viper species found in Central America. His research examined how the toxin affects skeletal muscle, using biochemical and microscopic methods. He received his Ph.D. in 1984. Following his doctorate, Gutiérrez returned to Costa Rica and resumed his work at the Clodomiro Picado Institute. He also undertook research fellowships at the Instituto Butantan in São Paulo, Brazil, in 1996 and 2000.

== Career ==
Gutiérrez's career has been closely associated with the Clodomiro Picado Institute, a research and antivenom production unit within the Faculty of Microbiology at the University of Costa Rica. He held successive academic positions there, becoming an associate professor in 1986 and a full professor in 1994. In 2019, after his retirement, he became an emeritus professor. He served as director of the Clodomiro Picado Institute from 1988 to 1996 and later led its research division.

His institutional work combined laboratory research with antivenom development and evaluation, scientific training, teaching, social extension, and international collaboration. Gutiérrez also held academic leadership roles in graduate education. He directed the University of Costa Rica's graduate program in microbiology, parasitology, and clinical chemistry from 1986 to 1988 and coordinated a master's program in biomedical sciences involving the Central American University Higher Council (CSUCA) and the Karolinska Institute from 1987 to 1989. In addition to his research and teaching, Gutiérrez has contributed to scientific publishing. He served on the editorial board of Toxicon, the journal of the International Society on Toxinology, and was its associate editor from 2017 to 2025. He has also served as a section editor for PLOS Neglected Tropical Diseases.

== Research ==
=== Snake venom toxins and tissue damage ===
A major focus of Gutiérrez's research has been the mechanisms by which snake venoms cause local tissue damage, particularly following bites from vipers. Such damage can include muscle necrosis, hemorrhage, inflammation, and impaired tissue repair. His work has combined biochemical analysis of venom components with experimental pathology to investigate how these effects develop.

=== Myotoxic phospholipases A₂ ===
Gutiérrez has studied myotoxic phospholipases A₂ and related proteins found in viper venoms. These toxins can damage skeletal muscle and contribute to the tissue necrosis associated with snakebite. His research examined how they affect muscle-cell membranes and cellular processes, including calcium regulation, and investigated why muscle regeneration after venom-induced injury is impaired.

=== Snake venom metalloproteinases and hemorrhage ===
Another major area of Gutiérrez's research concerns snake venom metalloproteinases, zincdependent enzymes that contribute to hemorrhage and local tissue injury. Working with collaborators, he investigated how these toxins damage the microvasculature by degrading components of the basement membrane that supports blood vessels. This research helped develop a mechanistic explanation for venom-induced hemorrhage: degradation of structural components at the basement membrane weakens capillary walls, making them more susceptible to rupture under biophysical forces operating in the circulation. His group also investigated differences among classes of metalloproteinases and their effects on extracellular matrix components, inflammation, and tissue repair.

=== Antivenom development and evaluation ===
Gutiérrez has conducted research on the efficacy of antivenoms used to treat snakebite envenoming. This work has included evaluating how effectively different antivenom preparations neutralize venom toxins and the local tissue damage and systemic effects they cause. His research has also addressed the development and assessment of antivenoms for regions where access to effective treatment has been limited. His work has included international collaborations involving antivenoms for medically important snakes in Latin America and other regions, including sub-Saharan Africa and Asia. He has also investigated the potential use of small-molecule toxin inhibitors, including phospholipase A2 and metalloproteinase inhibitors, as possible adjuncts to conventional antivenom treatment.

=== Snakebite envenoming and public health ===
Alongside his laboratory research, Gutiérrez has contributed to international efforts to address snakebite as a neglected public-health problem. He has worked with the World Health Organization, the Pan American Health Organization, and other stakeholders, including the government of Costa Rica, on antivenom policy, treatment access, and strategies to reduce the burden of snakebite envenoming.

In 2006, he co-authored the paper “Confronting the Neglected Problem of Snake Bite Envenoming: the Need for a Global Partnership,” which called for greater international attention and coordinated action. He later co-authored research and policy papers on the integration of snakebite into global strategies for neglected tropical diseases.

His 2017 review article, “Snakebite envenoming,” examined the epidemiology, clinical effects, and treatment of the condition. Gutiérrez has also written about the need for transdisciplinary approaches that combine biomedical research with public health, social science, health-system development, and community engagement. This work addresses the disproportionate impact of snakebite on rural populations in tropical and subtropical regions, where access to timely and affordable treatment may be limited.

== Awards and honors ==
- 1981: National Award of Science and Technology “Dr. Clodomiro Picado Twight,” Costa Rica
- 1990: TWAS-CONICIT Award for young scientists in biological sciences
- 1997: Sven Brohult Award
- 1998: Áncora Award in sciences
- 2007: Researcher of the Year in Health Sciences, University of Costa Rica
- 2015: Redi Award from the International Society on Toxinology.
- 2020: Rodrigo Facio Brenes Award from the University of Costa Rica.
- 2022: National Magón Culture Award by Government of Costa Rica

== Selected publications ==
- Gutiérrez, JoséMaría; Lomonte, Bruno (1995). "Phospholipase A2 myotoxins from Bothrops snake venoms". Toxicon. 33 (11): 1405–1424. doi:10.1016/0041-0101(95)00085-z. ISSN 0041-0101. PMID 8744981.
- Gutiérrez, José Marı́a; Ownby, Charlotte L (2003). "Skeletal muscle degeneration induced by venom phospholipases A2: insights into the mechanisms of local and systemic myotoxicity". Toxicon. 42 (8): 915–931. doi:10.1016/j.toxicon.2003.11.005. ISSN 0041-0101. PMID 15019491.
- Gutiérrez, J (2000-09-10). "Snake venom metalloproteinases:Their role in the pathogenesis of local tissue damage". Biochimie. 82 (9–10): 841–850. doi:10.1016/s0300-9084(00)01163-9. ISSN 0300-9084. PMID 11086214.
- Gutiérrez, J.M.; Rojas, E.; Quesada, L.; León, G.; Núñez, J.; Laing, G.D.; Sasa, M.; Renjifo, J.M.; Nasidi, A.; Warrell, D.A.; Theakston, R.D.G.; Rojas, G. (2005). "Pan-African polyspecific antivenom produced by caprylic acid purification of horse IgG: an alternative to the antivenom crisis in Africa". Transactions of the Royal Society of Tropical Medicine and Hygiene. 99 (6): 468–475. doi:10.1016/j.trstmh.2004.09.014. ISSN 0035-9203. PMID 15837359.
- Gutiérrez, José María; Theakston, R. David G; Warrell, David A (2006-06-06). "Confronting the Neglected Problem of Snake Bite Envenoming: The Need for a Global Partnership". PLOS Medicine. 3 (6) e150. doi:10.1371/journal.pmed.0030150. ISSN 1549-1676. PMC 1472552. PMID 16729843.
- Gutiérrez, José María; Warrell, David A.; Williams, David J.; Jensen, Simon; Brown, Nicholas; Calvete, Juan J.; Harrison, Robert A. (2013-06-13). "The Need for Full Integration of Snakebite Envenoming within a Global Strategy to Combat the Neglected Tropical Diseases: The Way Forward". PLOS Neglected Tropical Diseases. 7 (6) e2162. Bibcode:2013PNTDi...7e2162G. doi:10.1371/journal.pntd.0002162. ISSN 1935-2735. PMC 3681653. PMID 23785526.
- Gutiérrez, José María; Calvete, Juan J.; Habib, Abdulrazaq G.; Harrison, Robert A.; Williams, David J.; Warrell, David A. (2017-09-14). "Snakebite envenoming". Nature Reviews Disease Primers. 3 (1) 17063. doi:10.1038/nrdp.2017.63. ISSN 2056-676X. PMID 28905944.
- Gutiérrez, José María; Borri, Juliette; Giles-Vernick, Tamara; Duda, Romain; Habib, Abdulrazaq G.; Malhotra, Anita; Martín, Gerardo; Pintor, Anna F. V.; Potet, Julien; Scott, Terence; Bolon, Isabelle; de Castañeda, Rafael Ruiz (2022-11-17). "Understanding and tackling snakebite envenoming with transdisciplinary research". PLOS Neglected Tropical Diseases. 16 (11) e0010897. Bibcode:2022PNTDi..1610897G. doi:10.1371/journal.pntd.0010897. ISSN 1935-2735. PMC 9671370. PMID 36395090.
