= Stephen Seifert =

- Born: September 29, 1973 (age 52)
- Origin: Cincinnati, Ohio, US
- Genres: Folk, classical, jazz, old-time music
- Instrument: Mountain Dulcimer
- Website: http://stephenseifert.com

Stephen Seifert (born September 29, 1973) is an American folk musician and virtuoso Appalachian dulcimer player.

Seifert is internationally known and is a concert headlining performer. He was adjunct instructor of Mountain Dulcimer at Vanderbilt's Blair School of Music from 1997 to 2001. He has been a dulcimer soloist with Orchestra Nashville since 1996. He was featured on their concerto for mountain dulcimer and string orchestra with Connie Ellisor and David Schnaufer (Warner Classical recording, Blackberry Winter). Seifert has also performed this piece with the Charlotte Symphony Orchestra, the Tucson Symphony Orchestra, the Montpellier Chamber Orchestra, and the Adrian Symphony Orchestra. He has been called "...the world's leading dulcimer soloist..."

Seifert has released many educational DVDs and videos on the subject of dulcimer playing. He gives numerous dulcimer workshops in the US every year. He also served as an instructor at the John C. Campbell Folk School.

In 2020, he became a founding member of "The Steve Seifert Project," a virtual music group composed of members who are all named, "Steve Seifert" including the Albuquerque saxophonist, Steve Seifert and the Los Angeles bassist, Steve Seifert.
