= World Taiwanese Congress =

Flag of Taiwan made by the World Taiwanese Congress(WTC); it is also very commonly used by Taiwan independence supporters.

The World Taiwanese Congress (Chinese: 世界台灣人大會) is an annual meeting for organizations promoting formal Taiwanese independence. The organization was formed in the United States in December 2000. It holds its annual meeting in Taiwan.

== History ==
In September 2000, the "National Taiwanese Stand Up Movement" (Say Yes to Taiwan) was established in Taiwan. In December 2000, the Global Taiwanese Association jointly established the World Taiwanese Congress in Washington, D.C., the purpose of which is:

1. Carry forward the spirit of Taiwan and unite the strength of Taiwanese around the world
2. Safeguard Taiwan's sovereignty, independence and national security
3. Promote people-to-people diplomacy to enhance Taiwan's international status
4. Promote Taiwan's accession to the United Nations and other international organizations.

From March 17 to 18, 2001, the first meeting of the World Taiwanese Congress was held in Taipei. President Chen Shui-bian delivered a speech in person. On March 18, 2001, the World Taiwanese Congress and the National Taiwanese Stand Up Movement jointly held a "Love Taiwan, Love Unity" parade.

== Taiwanese domestic members ==
- Friends of Lee Teng-hui Association (台灣李登輝之友會總會)
- Hand-in-Hand To Safeguard TAIWAN Alliance (手護台灣大聯盟)
- World United Formosans for Independence (WUFI) (台灣獨立建國聯盟)
- The Presbyterian Church in Taiwan
- Taiwan Association of University Professors (台灣教授協會)
- Union of Taiwanese Teachers (台灣教師聯盟)
- n/a (台北水噹噹姊妹聯盟)
- n/a (台灣21世紀婦女會)
- The Taiwan United Nations Alliance (台灣聯合國協進會)
- National Alpine Association of Taiwan (台灣國家山岳協會)
- n/a (玉蘭花聯誼會)
- Goa-Seng-Lang Association For Taiwan Independence (「外省人」台灣獨立促進會)
- n/a (台灣228關懷總會)
- n/a (台灣獨立安全基督徒促進會)
- Foundation of Medical Professionals Alliance in Taiwan (台灣醫界聯盟基金會)
- Northern Taiwan Society (台灣北社)
- Central Taiwan Society (台灣中社)
- Eastern Taiwan Society (台灣東社)
- Southern Taiwan Society (台灣南社)
- n/a (台灣228和平促進會)
- n/a (台灣建築行業職業工會全國聯合總工會)
- n/a (台灣的店有限公司)
- Taiwan New Culture Mountain Association (台灣新文化登山會)
- n/a (台北市扁擔會)
- n/a (台灣愛台愛鄉總會)
- Research Association of National Peace-Security in Taiwan (台灣國家和平安全研究協會)
- n/a (台灣人捍衛隊)
- n/a (台灣安全促進會)
- n/a (高雄打狗協會)
- Taiwan New Century Foundation (台灣新世紀文教基金會)
- n/a (鄭順娘文教公益基金會)
- Original Culture Society (原貌文化協會)

== Overseas member organizations ==
- World Taiwanese Congress (世界台灣人大會)
- World Federation of Taiwanese Associations (世界台灣同鄉會聯合會)
- Formosan Association for Public Affairs (FAPA) (台灣人公共事務協會)
- Taiwanese Association of America 全美台灣同鄉會)
- n/a (南美台灣人協會)
- Formosan Association for Human Rights (FAHR) (全美台灣人權協會)
- North America Taiwanese Women's Association (北美洲台灣婦女會)
- Professor Chen Wen-chen's Memorial Foundation (陳文成教授紀念基金會)
- Dr. Wang Kang-Lu Memorial Foundation (王康陸博士紀念基金會)
