= Stingray injury =

Injury from a stingray's barbed tail

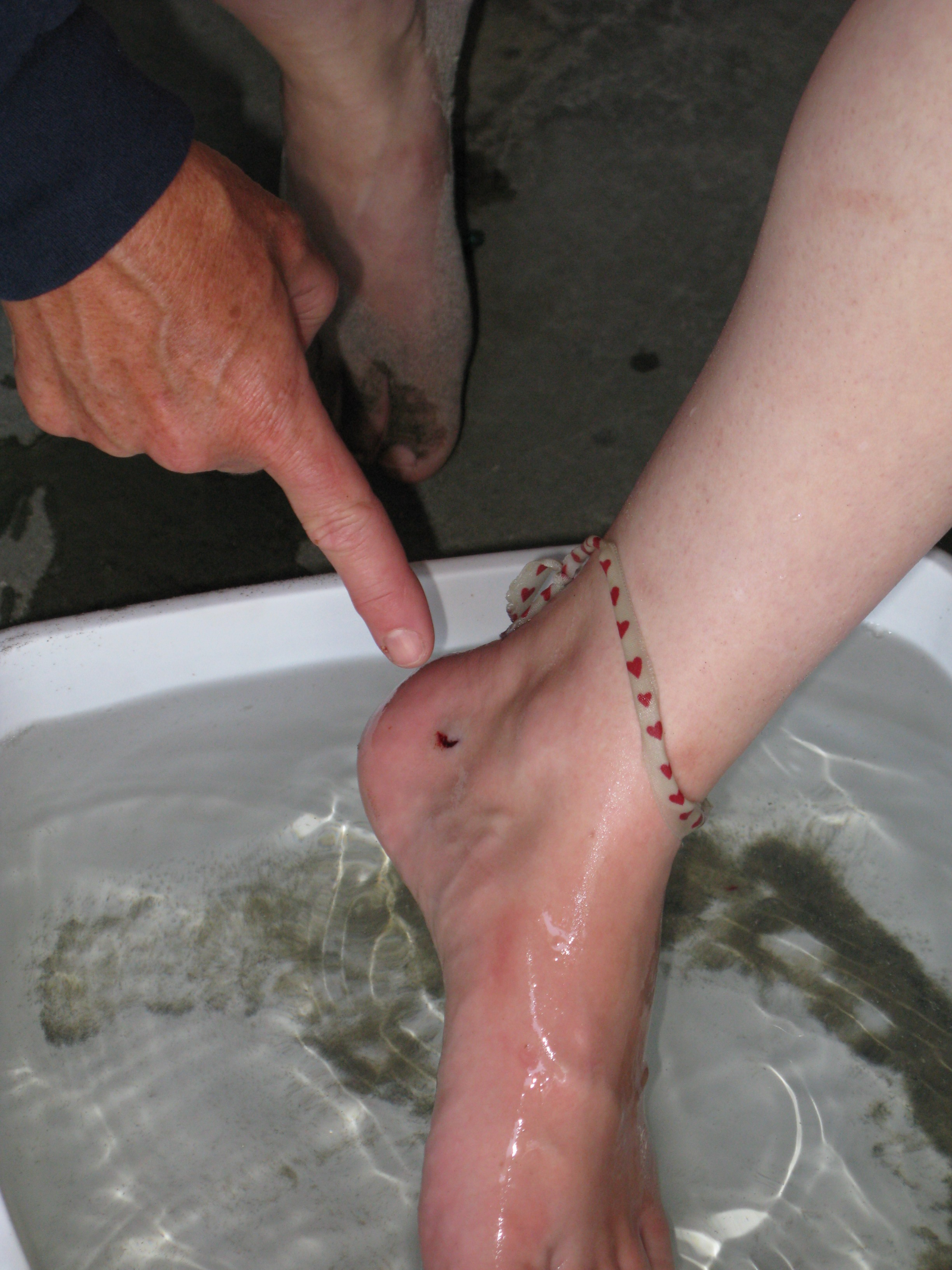
- Treatment of an injury in a life guard tower, with hot water
- Specialty: Emergency medicine
- Deaths: Steve Irwin

A stingray injury is caused by the venomous tail spines, stingers or dermal denticles of rays in the order Myliobatiformes, most significantly those belonging to the families Dasyatidae, Urotrygonidae, Urolophidae, and Potamotrygonidae. Stingrays generally do not attack aggressively or even actively defend themselves. When threatened, their primary reaction is to swim away. However, when attacked by predators or stepped on, the stinger in their tail is whipped up. This is normally ineffective against sharks, their main predator.

Depending on the size of the stingray, humans are usually stung in the lower limb region. Stings usually occur when swimmers or divers accidentally step on a stingray, but a human is less likely to be stung by simply brushing against the stinger. Those who enter waters with large populations of stingrays are advised to slide their feet through the sand rather than taking normal steps, as the rays detect the vibrations in the sand and swim away.

There are reports of stingers breaking off in wounds, but an American study of 119 cases found no instances of this occurring. This would not be fatal to the stingray as it will be regrown at a rate of about 1.25 to 2 centimetres (0.49 to 0.79 in) per month (though with significant variations depending on the size of the stingray and the exact species). Contact with the stinger causes local trauma (from the cut itself), pain, swelling, and muscle cramps from the venom, and possible later infection from bacteria or fungi.

Immediate injuries to humans include envenomation, punctures, severed arteries and veins, and rarely death.

Fatal stings are very rare; the most famous case is when Australian wildlife expert Steve Irwin died in 2006, which was only the second case recorded in Australia since 1945. In Irwin's case, the stinger penetrated his thoracic wall, causing massive trauma.

== Signs and symptoms ==
Symptoms can include nausea, vomiting, diarrhea, extreme pain at the wound, muscle cramps, and a laceration at the puncture site. There have been cases of severe consequences which may include embedded spines, infection, hypotension, and even possible amputations or death. Pain normally lasts up to 48 hours, but is most severe in the first 30–60 minutes and may be accompanied by nausea, fatigue, spreading cramps, headaches, fever, and chills. Stingray wounds have also been found to bleed for a relatively long time following the initial puncture, although there is no evidence that the secreted venom possesses anti-coagulant properties, as some have previously believed.

== Pathophysiology ==
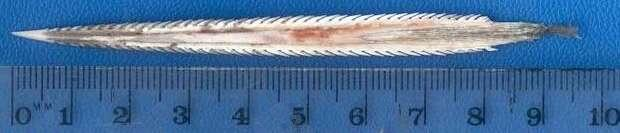
A stingray's barb (ruler in mm).

The barb is covered with rows of flat spines, composed of vasodentin. Vasodentin is an incredibly strong cartilaginous material which can easily cut through flesh. The undersides of the spines contain two longitudinal grooves which run along the length of the spine and enclose venom-secreting cells. Both the venom-secreting tissues and vasodentin are enveloped in an epidermis that tears open when the barb is plunged into a victim. Some spines may break off as the barb exits the wound and stay within the victim, causing prolonged envenomation.

== Treatment ==
Treatment for stings may include application of hot water, which has been shown to ease pain. Multiple theories as to the mechanism of pain relief from hot water have been suggested. A theory that hot water denatures the stingray venom has been questioned because the temperatures required would need to penetrate deeply into the puncture wound and would likely cause thermal damage to surrounding tissue. Other proposed mechanisms include modulation of pain receptors in the nervous system through mechanism such as the gate control theory and the diffuse noxious inhibitory control theory.

Antibiotics may be administered to prevent infection if there is a delay in treatment, if the wound is deep, or if there is a large amount of foreign material in the wound.

Pain may be treated with local anesthetic in and around the wound, a regional nerve blockade, or parenteral opiates such as intramuscular pethidine. Local anesthetic may bring almost instant relief for several hours. Vinegar and papain are ineffective.

== See also ==
- Weever
- Scorpion fish
- Stone fish
- Snake bite
- Skin lesion
- Findlay E. Russell
- Odysseus Acanthoplex
