= American Board of Applied Toxicology =

- Abbreviation: ABAT
- Founded: 1985
- Headquarters: McLean, Virginia, U.S.
- Fields: Toxicology
- Website: www.clintox.org/education/abat

The American Board of Applied Toxicology (ABAT) was established in 1985 as a standing committee by the American Academy of Clinical Toxicology. The board functions to recognize and credential clinical toxicologists who have demonstrated competence in the management of toxicity related to poisoning, overdose, chemical exposure, envenomation, or environmental exposures. Candidates for board certification are health professionals (pharmacists, nurses, PhD biomedical scientists) with minimum perquisite experience in poisoning and overdose management as well as satisfactory experience in other core areas such as toxicology research, public health, and outreach. The ABAT establishes minimum competency for clinical toxicologists (professionals who manage poisoning, overdose, and chemical toxicity) via administering examinations and maintaining certification renewal of diplomates. Successfully passing the ABAT board certification exam provides the taker a designation of Diplomate of the American Board of Applied Toxicology (DABAT). A DABAT designation privileges the clinical toxicologist to provide medical back up and consultation on poisoning, drug overdoses, or toxicity, often via poison centers. The DABAT designation also has legal implication in allowing credentialed toxicologists to manage a poison center in the United States. Credentialed DABAT members must recertify every 5 years via an application demonstrating continued competence and activity in clinical toxicology.

== History ==
In 1974 the American Academy of Clinical Toxicology established the American Board of Medical Toxicology to recognize physicians competent in the management of poisoning and drug overdose in the United States. Eleven years later in 1985 the American Board of Applied Toxicology was created. The inaugural ABAT examination was provided in 1987 for the first ABAT diplomates. The ABAT board is composed of ABAT diplomates who have been elected to the board of directors. The American Board of Medical Toxicology established by AACT later became the American College of Medical Toxicology once officially recognized as a subspecialty and is responsible for governing board certification status of physician toxicologists. Veterinarian toxicologists are certified via the American Board of Veterinary Toxicology. PhD research toxicologists (Non clinical toxicologists, i.e., those not directly participating in therapeutic management of patients) are certified via the American Board of Toxicology (ABT). ABAT encompasses certification for all clinical non-physician or veterinarian toxicologists.

== Credentialing ==
Candidates for ABAT examination must meet educational (doctoral degree in health sciences or baccalaureate with sufficient experience) and experiential requirements (post graduate residency or fellowship training, or equivalent work experience). Additionally candidates must have cared for a minimum number of human patients experiencing toxic exposures as well as satisfy criteria in teaching, publication of peer-reviewed scientific literature, research, and outreach to qualify to sit for the ABAT exam.

== Activities ==
- Managing and clinically supervising poison centers and staff
- Consultation on poisoning, drug overdose, or health risk assessment
- Medicolegal and forensic expert witness consultation
- Poisoning epidemiology research
- Clinical research and creation of poisoning management guidelines
- Bed side patient management in the acute care and emergency medicine setting
