= Chen-Yuan Lee =

Taiwanese pharmacologist and political activist

Chen-Yuan Lee,

President of the IST
- In office 1985–1988
- Preceded by: Gerhard Habermehl
- Succeeded by: Philip Rosenberg

1st Chairperson of the TAIP
- In office 1996–1997
- Preceded by: Office established
- Succeeded by: Koh Se-kai

Personal details
- Born: December 4, 1915 Kaohsiung, Taiwan
- Died: November 1, 2001 (aged 85) Taipei, Taiwan
- Party: Taiwan Independence Party
- Education: Taihoku Imperial University
- Profession: Pharmacologist

Chen-Yuan Lee (Chinese: 李鎮源; pinyin: Lǐ Zhènyuán; Wade–Giles: Lǐ Chèn-yǘan; Pe̍h-ōe-jī: Lí Tìn-goân; December 4, 1915 – November 1, 2001), was a Taiwanese pharmacologist and political activist. He is famous for his research on snake venom. He was a recipient of the prestigious Redi Award from the International Society on Toxinology (IST), and was also a former president of the society. He was a former dean of the National Taiwan University College of Medicine. After his retirement from researching, he focused on participating in the Taiwan independence movement and many democratic movement. Lee had founded many political organizations such as the "100 Action Union" (100行動聯盟), Foundation of Medical Professionals Alliance in Taiwan. He was also the first chairperson of the Taiwan Independence Party.

== Early years ==
Lee was born in Takao Prefecture (present-day Kaohsiung), Taiwan in 1915. Both of his parents were from Tainan. Lee chose to become a medical doctor after his father and three of his siblings died of malaria and infectious diseases.

Lee grew up in Tainan, where he had outstanding grades. After graduating from the Tainan Prefecture Second High School (now the National Tainan First Senior High School), he attended the Taihoku School of Higher Education (臺北高等學校). He entered the medical department of Taihoku Imperial University in 1936, and became one of the first graduates from the department.

Lee enjoyed basic medical studies after entering the medical department. He finished his first research paper in his freshman year, which was published in the Taiwanese Medical Magazine (台灣醫學雜誌). After graduating in 1940, Lee decided to quit clinical medicine and keep on studying. He became the assistant of Tu Tsung-ming, who was researching on basic medical studies and, at the time, the only Taiwanese professors in the medical department. He once said, To gain honor for Taiwan, dignity for the Taiwanese, I chose to follow Professor Tu instead of several other Japanese professors. Because I thought Professor Tu was our people, and we should help him.

== Career and achievements ==
The first research Lee did after becoming Tu's assistant was the "Using Kushenji (苦蔘子) to cure dysentery." He discovered that the glycosides contained in the Kushenji can be used to kill an amoeba, and solved a Chinese herbological myth on how the Kushenji cures dysentery. In 1945, Lee published a research paper with a title of "The Toxicological Research on the Venom of Daboia" (鎖鏈蛇蛇毒的毒物學研究), the paper was world's first paper to explain the cause of death by the venom of Daboia. Because of this outstanding achievement, Lee was recognized by getting his medical doctor degree. This recognition began his career as researching snake venom.

In 1952, Lee was financially supported by the Economic Cooperation Administration (美援會) and was sent to the University of Pennsylvania Medical School for further education. This was his first time studying abroad. Lee originally wanted to do research on the circulatory system, but because of the limitation of time, his instructor Carl F. Schmidt suggested that he change his topic to pulmonary circulation. After researching at the University of Pennsylvania, he transferred to Wayne State University in Detroit, where he visited Walter Segeers's lab for two months and published a small-sized research paper.

After Lee's return to Taiwan, he started his job as a leader at the pharmacology lab of National Taiwan University due to the dimission of Tsungming Tu. In 1963, Lee worked with Chang Chuan-chung (張傳炯), a chemist, and separated the deadly α-type and β-type bungarotoxins of the venom of Bungarus multicinctus. This was a big step in neuroscience, medical science, and pharmacology.

Over the years, Lee had published over a hundred research papers. He not only became a leader of pharmacology in Taiwan, but also an international authority in the field of venom snake research. In 1970, he was elected a member of Academia Sinica, the national academy of Taiwan. He was the second person employed by National Taiwan University's College of Medicine to be elected to Academia Sinica. He became the dean of the National Taiwan University College of Medicine in 1972. Four years later, he was awarded the "Redi Prize" by the International Society on Toxinology. In 1979, he received an invitation from Springer Science+Business Media to serve as the chief editor for the books Chemistry of Protein Toxins in Snake Venoms and The Action of Snake Venoms on Nerve and Muscle, which established his high position in researching snake venom. In 1985, he chosen to serve as the president of the International Society on Toxinology, and became one of the few Taiwanese scholars to lead an international research organization.

Cover of The Story of Snake Venom Research in Taiwan

Nobel Prize laureate Yuan T. Lee wrote in the foreword of the book The Story of Snake Venom Research in Taiwan (台灣蛇毒傳奇) that he once had asked another Nobel Prize laureate Joseph L. Goldstein, "In the Taiwanese life science field, whose research is recognized internationally?" Without the least hesitation, Goldstein answered, "Chen-Yuan Lee is internationally recognized."

Lee retired in 1986 from National Taiwan University College of Medicine, and was immediately named a professor emeritus by the university.

== Entry into politics ==
In March 1990, over 300,000 students participated in the Wild Lily student movement for democratic reform. Lee, who was almost eighty years old, accompanied the protesting students. This was his first time participating in a political movement.

In 1991, along with several colleagues, Chen-Yuan Lee visited Lee Ying-yuan and Kuo Pei-hung, two Taiwan Independence supporters and alumni of the National Taiwan University who were arrested for "planning to revolt" (預備叛亂罪) and were detained in the Tucheng Detention Center. Later, he felt that the Punishment of Rebellion Act and Article 100 of the Criminal Code of the Republic of China impeded the democratic development of Taiwan because they were simply tools to help Kuomintang dominate Taiwan. As a result, he organized the "100 Action Union," which stands for the abolishment of Article 100 of the Criminal Code. He, as a member of Academia Sinica, joined a sit-down demonstration, leading the "100 Action Union" and successfully expressed the Taiwanese people's desire for human rights.

Chen-Yuan Lee was the founding chairman of the Taiwan Independence Party from 1996 to 1997, and left the party after Chen Shui-bian won the 2000 Taiwanese presidential election.

== Notes ==
Party political offices
New title	Chairperson of the TAIP; 1996–1997	Succeeded by Koh Se-kai
