= A. K. Mukherjee =

Indian biochemist

Ashis. K. Mukherjee
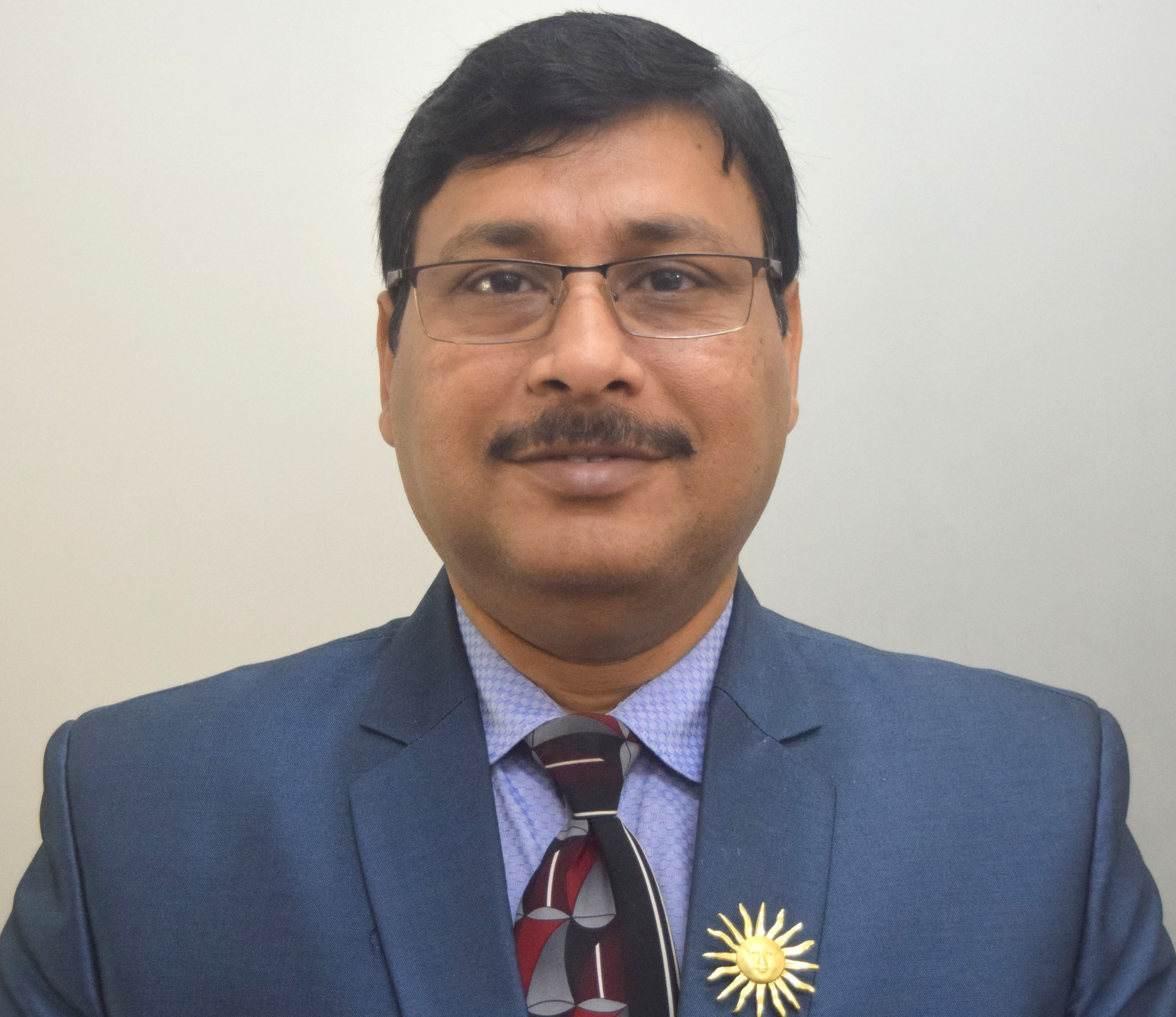
- Born: Purulia, West Bengal, India
- Education: Banaras Hindu University; Burdwan Medical College; University of Calcutta; Indian Institute of Chemical Biology
- Known for: Studies on snake venom biochemistry
- Awards: 2008 TU Best Researcher Award; 2010 DBT Dr. J. N. Baruah Memorial Science Award; 2013 N-BIOS Prize; 2013 Unit of Excellence Award; 2014 SBCI Sreenivasaya Memorial Award; ISCA Young Scientist Award; AMBI Young Scientist Award; ZSI Young Scientist Award; PSI Young Scientist Award; 2014 Sreenivasaya Memorial Award; 2018 Visitor’s Award
- Scientific career
- Fields: Snake venom biochemistry; Environmental biotechnology; Industrial microbiology; Drug discovery from natural resources
- Workplaces: Tezpur University; University of Northern Colorado; University of Connecticut Health Center

Ashis K. Mukherjee is an Indian biochemist specializing in snake venom biochemistry, molecular biology and microbiology. He served as the Head of the Department of Molecular Biology and Biotechnology of Tezpur University during 2008– 2011. Known for his research on snake venom biochemistry, proteomic composition and other proteins related work from microbial and plant background, Mukherjee serves as the head and coordinator of the Nodal Center for Medical Colleges and Biomedical Research Institutes of North East India at Tezpur University. The Department of Biotechnology of the Government of India awarded him the National Bioscience Award for Career Development, for his contributions to biosciences, in 2013. Mukherjee has also received the Visitor's Award 2018 for research in the fields of basic and applied sciences from the President of India. Mukherjee is elected fellow of Indian Academy of Sciences , National Academy of Medical Sciences , National Academy of Sciences, India , Royal Society of Chemistry

== Biography ==
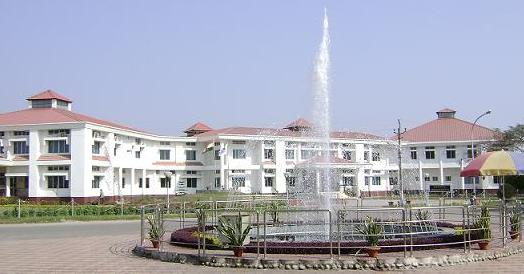
Tezpur University

A. K. Mukherjee, born in Purulia, in the Indian state of West Bengal, graduated in science with honours from Banaras Hindu University in 1990 with first rank and continued at the university for his master's degree in biochemistry which he completed in 1992, again with first rank. Moving to Burdwan Medical College of Burdwan University for his doctoral research as a junior research fellow of UGC-CSIR NET, Mukherjee earned a PhD in 1998; later, he would also receive a DSc from the University of Kolkata in 2017. He joined the Department of Molecular Biology and Biotechnology of Tezpur University in 1997 as a lecturer where he continues his career and holds the position of a professor since 2009, heading the Centre for Petroleum Biotechnology (CPBT).

Mukherjee also serves as the head and coordinator of the Nodal Center for Medical Colleges and Biomedical Research Institutes of North East India at Tezpur University and is associated with the University of Connecticut Health Center as a Sabbatical Visitor at their Department of Molecular, Microbial and Structural Biology, School of Medicine, and with the University of Northern Colorado as a visiting scientist at the School of Biological Sciences.

== Professional profile ==
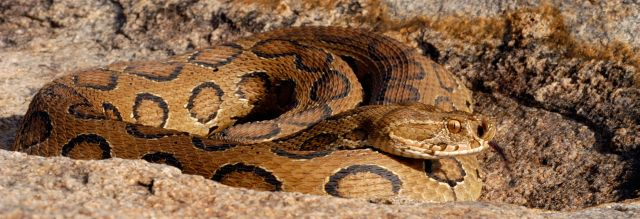
Russell's viper - a focus of Mukherjee's toxinological research

Mukherjee focuses his research on toxinology with special focus on snake venom biochemistry and has headed a number of projects as the principal investigator. His studies have been documented by way of a number of articles (Note: Please see Selected bibliography section) and ResearchGate, an online repository of scientific articles has listed 126 of them.Mukherjee has contributed chapters to books published by others and has guided several masters and doctoral researchers. He is also a resource person for the Tezpur Regional Office of Pollution Control Board. and is one of the founders of Tezpur University chapter of the Toxinology Society of India.

== Awards and honors ==
Mukherjee, who has received the BOYSCAST fellowship of the Department of Biotechnology, has also received the Young Scientist Award from a number of institutions such as the Indian Science Congress Association, the Association of Medical Biochemists of India, the Zoological Society of India, and the Physiological Society of India. He received the Best Researcher Award of Tezpur University in 2008 and the Assam Science Society awarded him the Dr J. N. Baruah Memorial Science Award in 2010. The Department of Biotechnology (DBT) of the Government of India awarded him the National Bioscience Award for Career Development, one of the highest Indian science awards in 2013. Mukherjee received the Sreenivasaya Memorial Award of the Society of Biological Chemists (India) in 2014. He is also a recipient of the Crest Award and the Units of Excellence Award of the Department of Biotechnology and the Visitor's Award 2018 for research in the fields of basic and applied sciences.

== Selected bibliography ==
=== Chapters ===
- Sajal Chakraborti; Naranjan S. Dhalla (4 December 2013). Proteases in Health and Disease. Springer Science & Business Media. pp. 162–. ISBN 978-1-4614-9233-7.

=== Articles ===
- Gogoi, Debananda; Arora, Neha; Kalita, Bhargab; Sarma, Rahul; Islam, Taufikul; S. Ghosh, Sidhhartha; Devi, Rajlakshmi; Mukherjee, Ashis (1 December 2018). "Anticoagulant mechanism, pharmacological activity, and assessment of preclinical safety of a novel fibrin(ogen)olytic serine protease from leaves of Leucas indica". Scientific Reports. 8 (1): 6210. Bibcode:2018NatSR...8.6210G. doi:10.1038/s41598-018-24422-y. PMC 5906637. PMID 29670183.
- Mukherjee, Ashis; Saviola, Anthony; Mackessy, Stephen (1 April 2018). "Cellular mechanism of resistance of human colorectal adenocarcinoma cells against apoptosis-induction by Russell's Viper venom L-amino acid oxidase (Rusvinoxidase)". Biochimie. 150: 8–15. doi:10.1016/j.biochi.2018.04.017. PMID 29702182. S2CID 23814965.
- Kalita, Bhargab; Patra, Aparup; Jahan, Shagufta; Mukherjee, Ashis (10 May 2018). "First report of the characterization of a snake venom apyrase (Ruviapyrase) from Indian Russell's viper ( Daboia russelii ) venom". International Journal of Biological Macromolecules. 111: 639–648. doi:10.1016/j.ijbiomac.2018.01.038. PMID 29325746.
- Patra, Aparup; Kalita, Bhargab; Chanda, Abhishek; Mukherjee, Ashis (7 December 2017). "Supplementary Material". Scientific Reports.

== See also ==
- Apyrase
- Serine protease
