= North American Society of Toxinology =

- Years active: 2012–present
- Website: www.nastox.org/index.html

The North American Society of Toxinology (NAST) is a North America-based, international, multidisciplinary organization dedicated to the advancement of the science of all things venomous. It was founded in 2012 and is a 501(c)(3) organization under the U.S. Internal Revenue Service.

== Origin ==
The progenitor meeting of Venom Week Symposiums, "Snakebites in the New Millennium," was held in 2005 in Omaha, NE.

The first meeting named as Venom Week was held in 2007 in Tucson, AZ . and subsequent meetings were held on an ad hoc basis until 2012, when NAST was founded at the combined Venom Week IV/International Society on Toxinology meeting in Honolulu to take on the organizing, and become the primary sponsor of, future Venom Week Symposiums.

== Foundation ==
At the Venom Week VI meeting (Kingsville, TX, 2018), in recognition of their roles in the founding of NAST, the "Founder Award" was given to James Armitage, Leslie Boyer, Sean Bush, Dan Keyler, Steven Seifert and Carl-Wilhelm Vogel.

== Organization and Membership ==
Members include medical clinicians, veterinarians, basic scientists, zoo and collection managers, animal scientists, herpetologists, antivenom researchers and developers, and others with an interest in venomous animals and their venoms. Additional information regarding membership can be found on the membership page of the Society's website.

The officers of the Society are elected by the members.

== Venom Week Meetings ==
Venom Week Symposiums have been held in 2005 (Omaha, NE), 2007 (Tucson, AZ), 2009 (Albuquerque, NM), 2012 (Honolulu, HI)), 2016 (Greenville, NC), 2018 (Kingsville, TX), and 2020 (Gainesville, FL). Venom Week 2022 will be held in Scottsdale, AZ, July 18 - 21, 2022.

== Publication ==
Toxicon is the official journal of the North American Society of Toxinology. The journal was started in 1963. It became the official journal of NAST in 2017 and is published monthly by Elsevier.
