= Medical toxicology =

Medical specialty

Medical toxicology is a subspecialty of medicine focusing on toxicology and providing the diagnosis, management, and prevention of poisoning and other adverse effects due to medications, occupational and environmental toxicants, and biological agents. Medical toxicologists are involved in the assessment and treatment of a wide variety of problems, including acute or chronic poisoning, adverse drug reactions (ADRs), drug overdoses, envenomations, substance abuse, industrial accidents, and other chemical exposures.

Medical toxicology is officially recognized as a medical subspecialty by the American Board of Medical Specialties. Its practitioners are physicians, whose primary specialization is generally in emergency medicine, occupational medicine, or pediatrics.

Medical toxicology is closely related to clinical toxicology, with the latter discipline encompassing non-physicians as well (generally pharmacists or scientists).

== Professional services and venues ==
- In emergency departments, intensive care units, and other inpatient units, medical toxicologists provide direct treatment and bedside consultation of acutely poisoned adults and children.
- In outpatient clinics, offices, and job sites, medical toxicologists evaluate the health impact from acute and chronic exposure to toxic substances in the workplace, home, and general environment.
- In regional poison control centers, medical toxicologists provide advice.
- In medical schools, universities, and clinical training sites, medical toxicologists teach, research, and provide advanced evidence-based patient care.
- In industry and commerce, medical toxicologists contribute to pharmaceutical research and drug safety.
- In government agencies, such as the Centers for Disease Control and Prevention and the Food and Drug Administration, medical toxicologists help with health policy. In some of these settings, medical toxicologists are employed to help other physicians prepare for dealing with the aftermath of crimes such as bioterrorism and war crimes such as chemical warfare and biological warfare.
- In clinical laboratories and forensic laboratories, medical toxicologists analyze and interpret diagnostic tests and forensic studies.

== See also ==
- Overdose
- Toxicology
- American College of Medical Toxicology
- American Association of Poison Control Centers
- American Academy of Clinical Toxicology
- Journal of Medical Toxicology
