= Francesco Redi =

Italian naturalist and poet

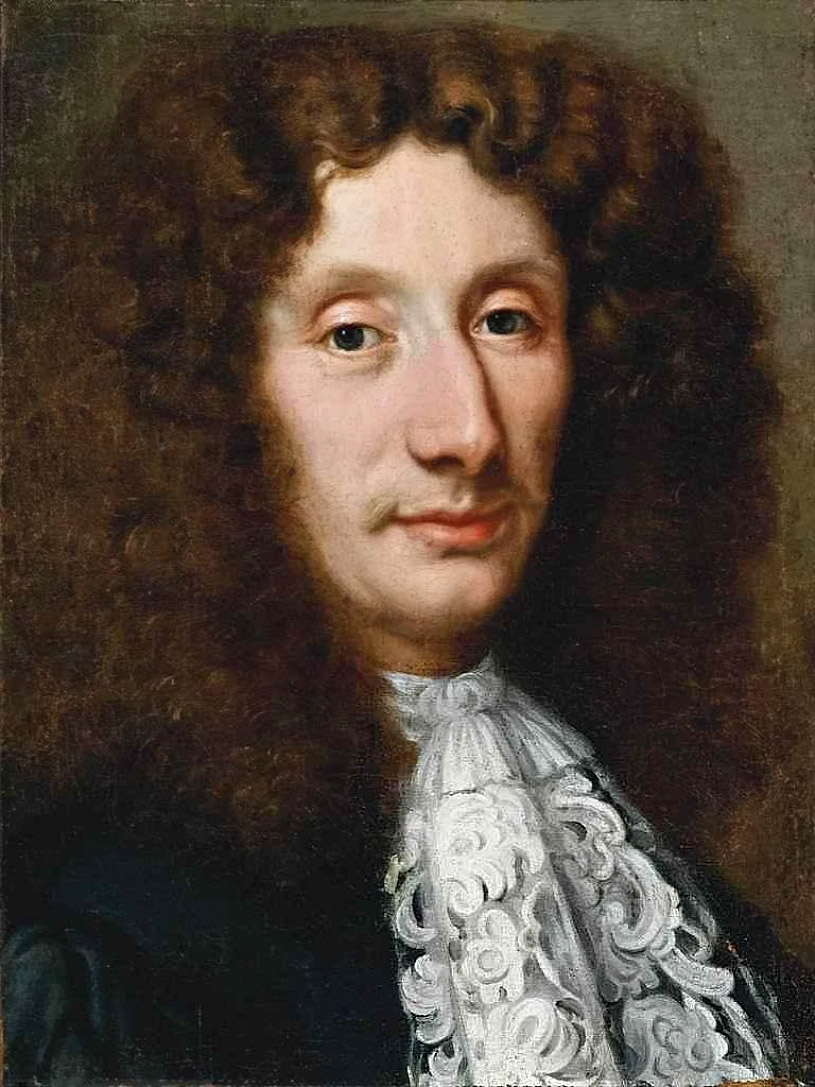
- Portrait by Jacob Ferdinand Voet
- Born: 18 February 1626; Arezzo, Grand Duchy of Tuscany
- Died: 1 March 1697 (aged 71); Pisa, Grand Duchy of Tuscany
- Education: University of Pisa
- Known for: Experimental biology, parasitology, criticism of spontaneous generation
- Scientific career
- Fields: Medicine, entomology, parasitology, linguistics
- Patrons: Ferdinando II de' Medici, Grand Duke of Tuscany

Signature
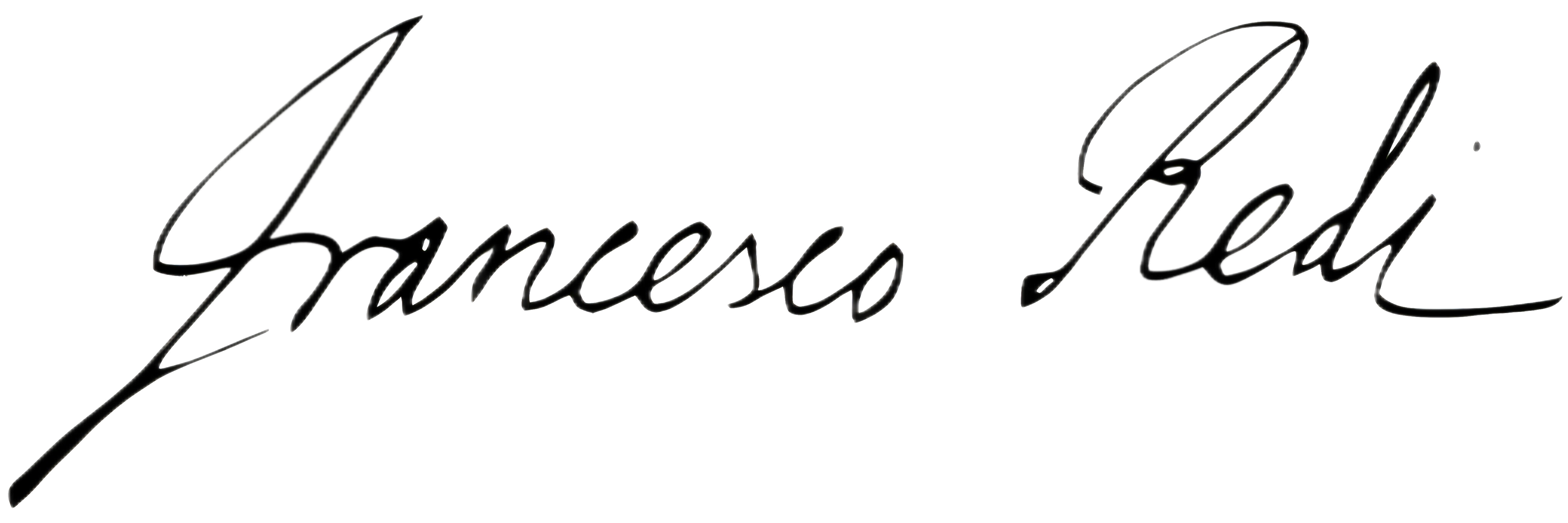

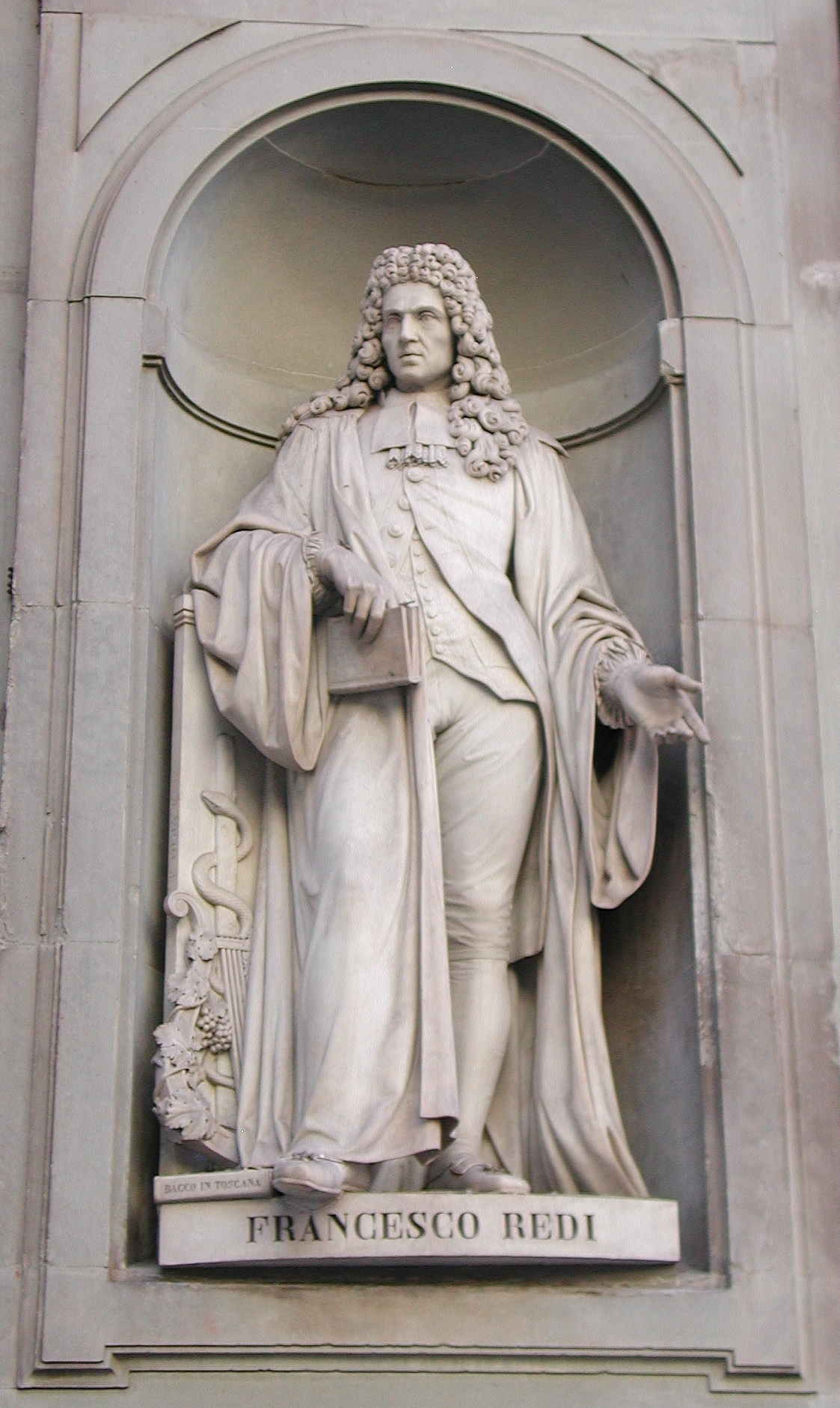
Statue of Francesco Redi on the Uffizi Gallery (Piazzale degli Uffizi) in Florence. At his feet is a copy of Bacco in Toscana.

Francesco Redi (18 February 1626 – 1 March 1697) was an Italian physician, naturalist, biologist, and poet. He is referred to as the "founder of experimental biology", and as the "father of modern parasitology". He was the first person to challenge the theory of spontaneous generation by demonstrating that maggots come from eggs of flies.

Having a doctoral degree in both medicine and philosophy from the University of Pisa at the age of 21, he worked in various cities of Italy. A rationalist of his time, he was a critic of verifiable myths, such as spontaneous generation. His most famous experiments are described in his magnum opus Esperienze intorno alla generazione degl'insetti (Experiments on the Generation of Insects), published in 1668. He disproved that vipers drink wine, can break glasses and that their venom is poisonous when ingested. He correctly observed that snake venoms were produced from the fangs, not the gallbladder, as was believed. He was also the first to recognize and correctly describe details of about 180 parasites, including Fasciola hepatica and Ascaris lumbricoides. He also distinguished earthworms from helminths (like tapeworms, flukes, and roundworms). He possibly originated the use of the control, the basis of experimental design in modern biology. A collection of his poems first published in 1685 Bacco in Toscana (Bacchus in Tuscany) is considered among the finest works of 17th-century Italian poetry, and for which the Grand Duke Cosimo III gave him a medal of honour.

== Biography ==
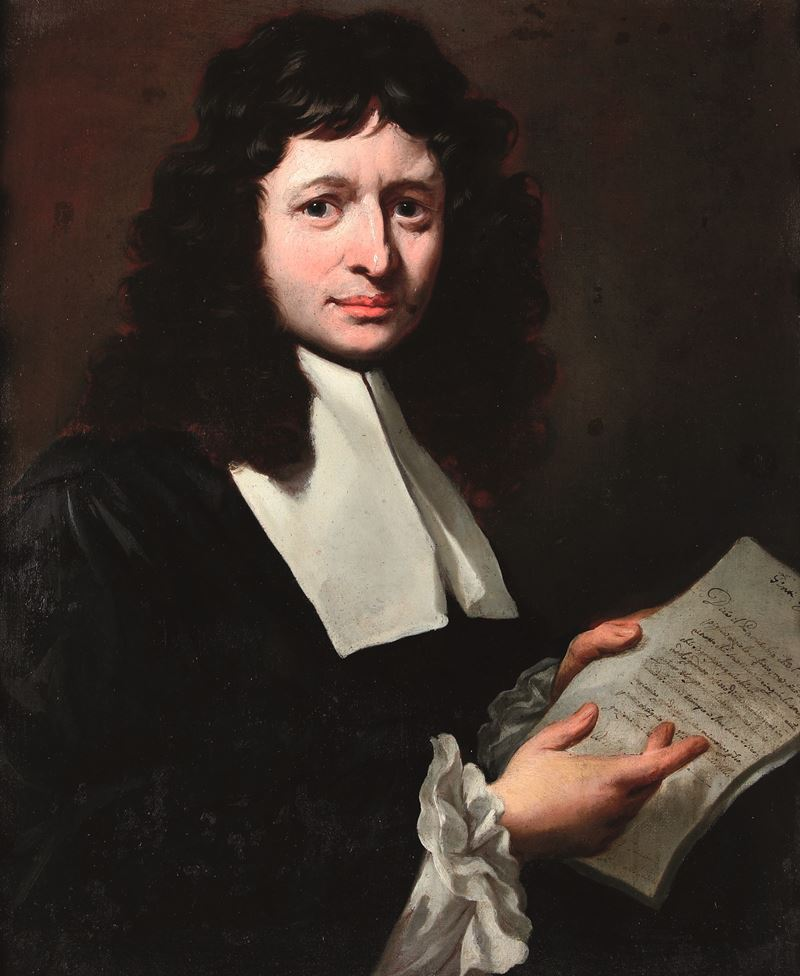
Portrait of Francesco Redi by Pietro Dandini

The son of Gregorio Redi and Cecilia de Ghinci, Francesco Redi was born in Arezzo on 18 February 1626. His father was a renowned physician at Florence. After schooling with the Jesuits, Francesco Redi attended the University of Pisa from where he obtained his doctoral degrees in medicine and philosophy in 1647, at the age of 21. He constantly moved, to Rome, Naples, Bologna, Padua, and Venice, and finally settled in Florence in 1648. Here he was registered at the Collegio Medico where he served at the Medici Court as both the head physician and superintendent of the ducal apothecary to Ferdinando II de' Medici, Grand Duke of Tuscany and his successor, Cosimo III. It is here that most of his academic works were achieved, which earned him membership in Accademia dei Lincei. He was also a member of the Accademia del Cimento (Academy of Experiment) from 1657 to 1667.

He died in his sleep on 1 March 1697 in Pisa and his remains were returned to Arezzo for interment.

A collection of his letters is held at the National Library of Medicine in Bethesda, Maryland.

== Scientific career ==
=== Experimental toxicology ===
In 1664 Redi wrote his first monumental work Osservazioni intorno alle vipere (Observations on Vipers) to his friend Lorenzo Magalotti, secretary of the Accademia del Cimento. In this he began to break the prevailing scientific myths (which he called "unmasking of the untruths") such as vipers drink wine and shatter glasses, their venom is poisonous if swallowed, the head of the dead viper is an antidote, the viper's venom is produced from the gallbladder, and so on. He explained rather how snake venom is unrelated to the snake’s bite, an idea contrary to popular belief. He performed a series of experiments on the effects of snakebites and demonstrated that venom was poisonous only when it enters the bloodstream via a bite, and that the fang contains venom in the form of yellow fluid. He even showed that by applying a tight ligature before the wound, the passage of venom into the heart could be prevented. This work marked the beginning of experimental toxinology/toxicology.

=== Entomology and spontaneous generation ===
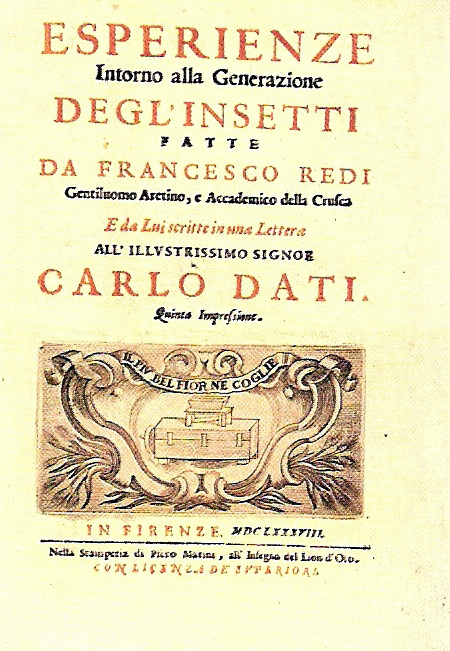
Esperienze intorno alla generazione degl'insetti frontcover

Redi is best known for his series of experiments, published in 1668 as Esperienze intorno alla generazione degl'insetti (Experiments on the Generation of Insects), which is regarded as his masterpiece and a milestone in the history of modern science. The book is one of the first steps in refuting "spontaneous generation"—a theory also known as Aristotelian abiogenesis. At the time, the prevailing wisdom was that maggots arose spontaneously from rotting meat.

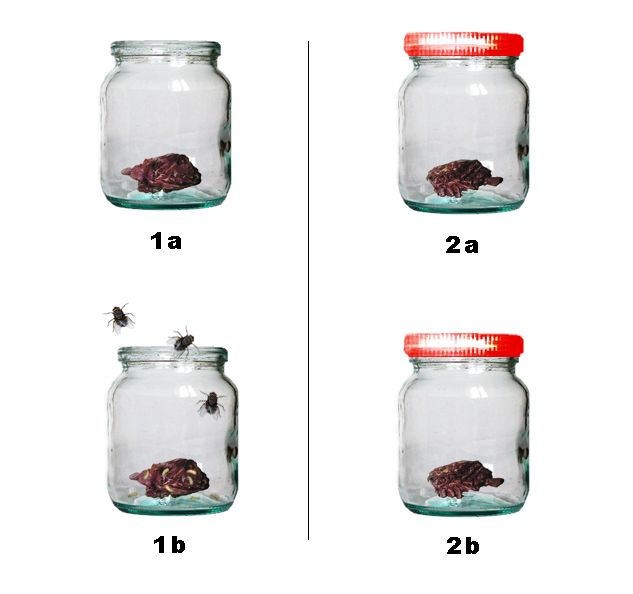
A modern rendering of Redi's experiment on abiogenesis

Redi took six jars and divided them into two groups of three: In one experiment, in the first jar of each group, he put an unknown object; in the second, a dead fish; in the last, a raw chunk of veal. Redi covered the tops of the first group of jars with fine gauze so that only air could get into them. He left the other group open. After several days, he saw maggots appear on the objects in the open jars, on which flies had been able to land, but not in the gauze-covered jars. In the second experiment, meat was kept in three jars. One of the jars was uncovered, and two of the jars were covered, one with cork and the other one with gauze. Flies could only enter the uncovered jar, and in this, maggots appeared. In the jar that was covered with gauze, maggots appeared on the gauze but did not survive.

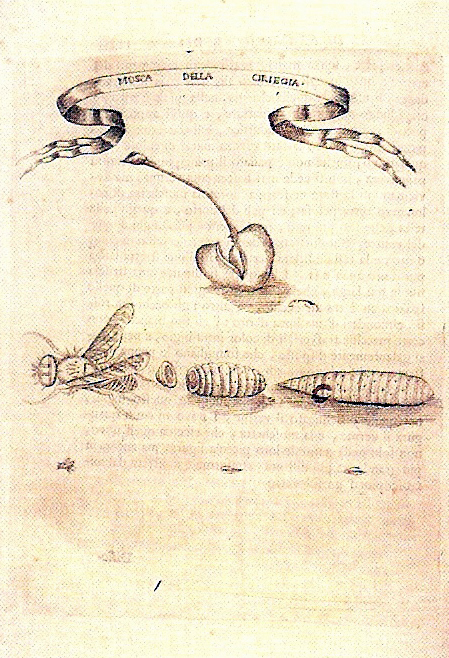
Illustration from Rediʼs Esperienze intorno alla generazione degl'insetti

Redi continued his experiments by capturing the maggots and waiting for them to metamorphose, which they did, becoming flies. Also, when dead flies or maggots were put in sealed jars with dead animals or veal, no maggots appeared, but when the same thing was done with living flies, maggots did. His interpretations were always based on biblical passages, such as his famous adage: omne vivum ex vivo ("All life comes from life").

=== Parasitology ===
Redi was the first to describe ectoparasites in his Esperienze intorno alla generazione degl'insetti. His notable illustrations in the book are those relevant to ticks, including deer ticks and tiger ticks; it also contains the first depiction of the larva of Cephenemyiinae, the nasal flies of deer, as well as the sheep liver fluke (Fasciola hepatica). His next treatise in 1684 titled Osservazioni intorno agli animali viventi che si trovano negli animali viventi (Observations on Living Animals, that are in Living Animals) recorded the descriptions and the illustrations of more than 100 parasites. In it, he also differentiates the earthworm (generally regarded as a helminth) and Ascaris lumbricoides, the human roundworm. An important innovation from the book is his experiments in chemotherapy in which he employed the "control"', the basis of experimental design in modern biological research. He described some 180 species of parasites. Perhaps, his most significant observation was that parasites produce eggs and develop from them, which contradicted the prevailing opinion that they are produced spontaneously.

== Literary career ==
As a poet, Redi is best known for the dithyramb Bacco in Toscana (Bacchus in Tuscany), which first appeared in 1685. His bacchanalian poem in praise of Tuscan wines is still read in Italy today. He was admitted to two literary societies: the Academy of Arcadia and the Accademia della Crusca. He was an active member of Crusca and supported the preparation of the Tuscan dictionary. He taught the Tuscan language as a lettore pubblico di lingua toscana in Florence in 1666. He also composed many other literary works, including his Letters, and Arianna Inferma.

== Eponyms ==
- Redi, a crater on Mars was named in his honor.
- The larval stage of parasitic fluke called "redia" is named after Redi by another Italian zoologist, Filippo de Filippi, in 1837.
- The Redi Award, the most prestigious award in toxinology, is given in his honour by the International Society on Toxinology. The award is made at each World Congress of IST (generally held every three years) since 1967.
- A scientific journal Redia, an Italian journal of zoology, is named in his honour, which was first published in 1903.
- A European viper subspecies, Vipera aspis francisciredi Laurenti, 1768, is named after him.

== See also ==
- Parasitology
