= Journal of Medical Toxicology =

- Discipline: Medical toxicology
- Language: English
- Edited by: Mark Mycyk

Publication details
- History: 2005–present
- Publisher: Springer Science+Business Media

Standard abbreviations
- ISO 4: J. Med. Toxicol.

Indexing
- ISSN: 1556-9039 (print); 1937-6995 (web)
- OCLC no.: 163567183

Links
- Journal homepage

The Journal of Medical Toxicology is a peer-reviewed medical journal on medical toxicology and the official journal of the American College of Medical Toxicology. It publishes original articles, illustrative cases, review articles, and other special features that are related to the clinical diagnosis and management of patients with exposure to various poisons. It was established in 2005 and published by the University of Pennsylvania Press. Since 2010 it is published by Springer Science+Business Media. The editor-in-chief is Mark Mycyk, MD.

== Abstracting and indexing ==
The journal is indexed or abstracted in:

- PubMed/Medline
- Scopus
- EMBASE
- Chemical Abstracts Service
- EBSCO databases
- Academic OneFile
- Academic Search
- Health Reference Center Academic
- Summon by Serial Solutions
