= Sean Bush =

American physician and academic

Sean Paul Bush
- Born: Sean Paul Bush
- Education: Texas A&M University (BS); Texas A&M University College of Medicine (MD)
- Occupations: Emergency physician, venomous bites and stings specialist
- Years active: 1996–present

Sean Paul Bush is an American emergency physician, academic, and researcher. An expert on venomous bites and stings, he was a host of the Animal Planet series, Venom ER. He is the current President of the North American Society of Toxinology.

== Career ==
Bush was on the faculty at Loma Linda University School of Medicine in Loma Linda, California. He has received two Research Training Awards (1999, 2005) from the Wilderness Medical Society, and a Hultgren Award (2001). He has appeared in television series including Venom ER, aired by the BBC and Animal Planet. He is the current President of the North American Society of Toxinology.

According to Scopus, he has an h-index of 19.

== Television ==
- Venom ER, (10-episode series), BBC, programme 1
- Untold Stories of the E.R. - "Too Close to Home" (AKA Snakebite Son), The Learning Channel
- I Was Bitten, Discovery Channel and Animal Planet
- Dr. Bite (AKA Miracle Man), Animal Planet
- Snake Underworld, National Geographic Wild Channel, 2011
- Venom: Nature's Killer, PBS-NOVA 2011
- Nightmares of Nature BBC, 2012
- The Snake Doctor, for UNC-TV:Life Changing television - Science, 201
