= Odysseus Acanthoplex =

Lost play from Ancient Greece

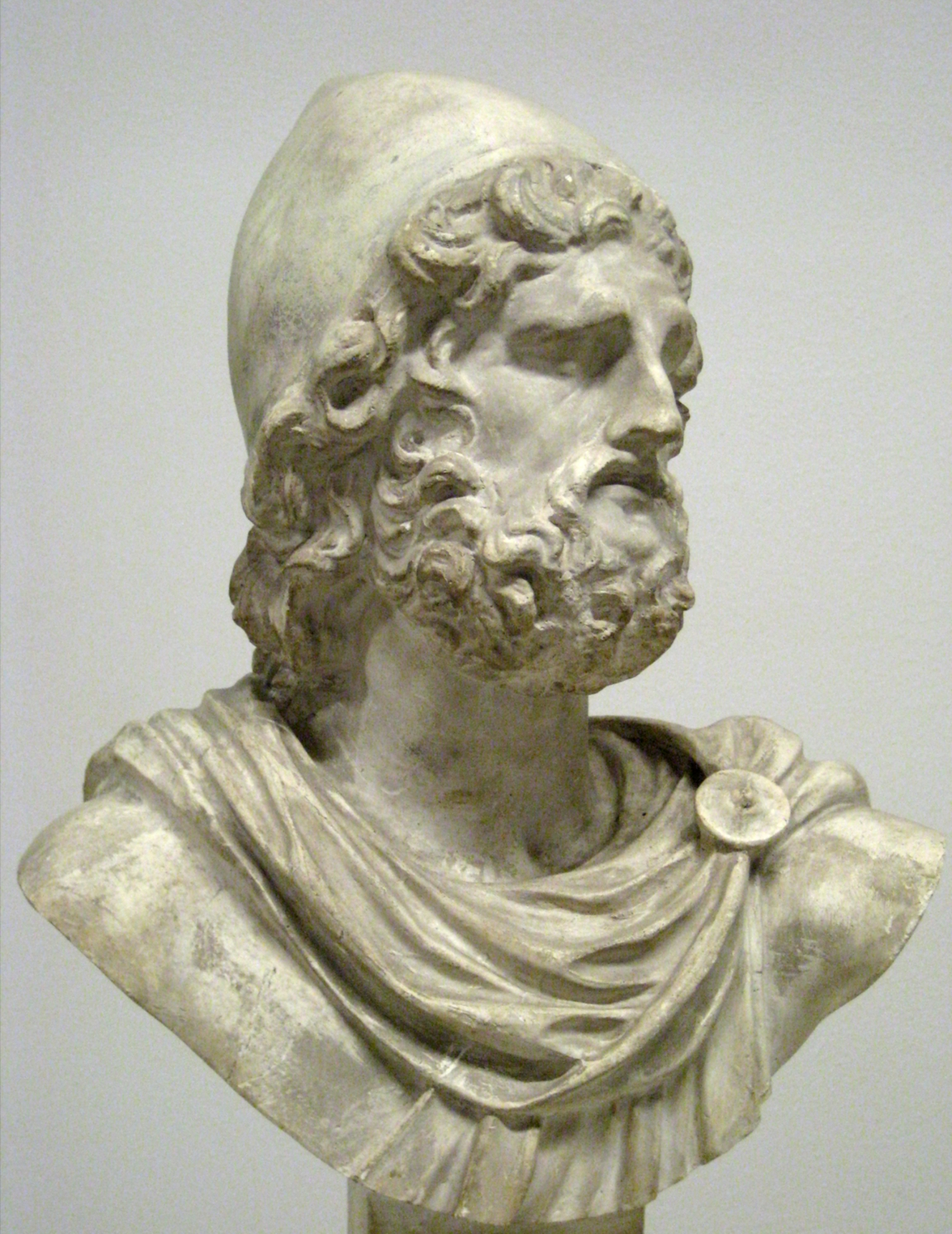
- Bust of Odysseus in the Pushkin Museum.
- Written by: Sophocles
- Characters: Odysseus, Telegonus, others
- Original language: Ancient Greek
- Genre: Athenian tragedy
- Setting: Ithaca

Premiere
- Date premiered: ca. 414 BCE?
- Place premiered: Athens

Odysseus Acanthoplex (Ancient Greek: Ὀδυσσεὺς ἀκανθοπλήξ, Odysseus Akanthoplēx, "Odysseus wounded by a spine"; also known as Odysseus Wounded, Odysseus Spine-struck and Odysseus Wounded by the Spine) is a lost play by the Athenian dramatist Sophocles. Several fragments are extant. The plot told of Odysseus' death, accidentally killed by his son Telegonus. Some scholars believe that another Sophocles title, Niptra (Νιπτρα, "The Footwashing", "The Washing"), is the same play as Odysseus Acanthoplex. Dana Sutton, however, disputes this, suggesting that Niptra was a separate play dealing with Odysseus' return to Ithaca but not with his death.

== Plot ==
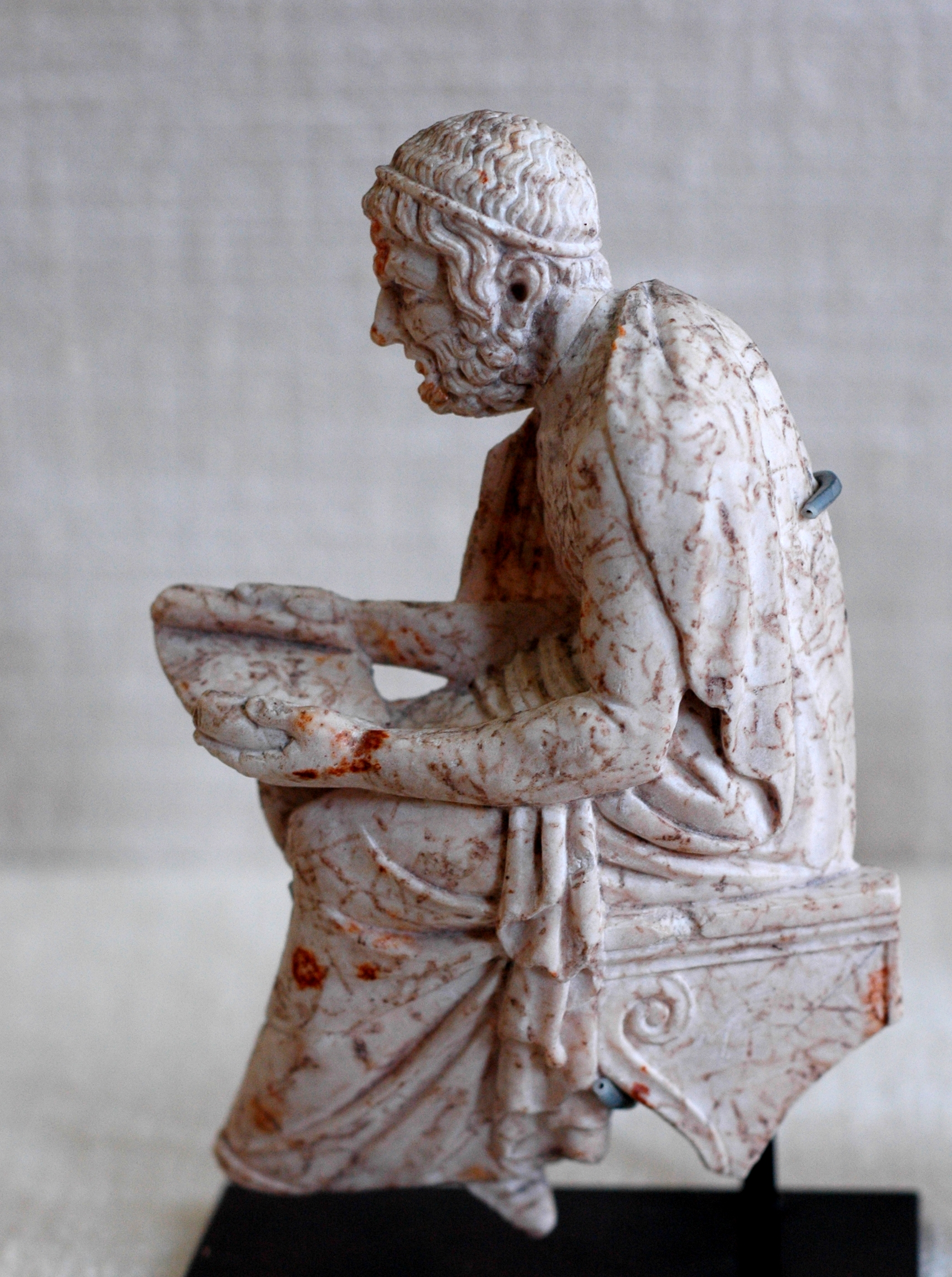
Statue of Sophocles

The plot of Odysseus Acanthoplex was derived from Telegony, part of the Epic Cycle. As background to the plot of the play, Homer's Odyssey tells of Odysseus spending a year with the goddess Circe. In the version of the myth that Odysseus Acanthoplex was based on, Odysseus and Circe had a son from this dalliance, Telegonus.

From what we know of the plot of the play, Telegonus arrived at Ithaca to reveal himself to his father. However, a fight ensued and Telegonus killed Odysseus without knowing who Odysseus was. In the myth, Telegonus used a spear that had a venomous stingray spine to kill Odysseus. The plot also dealt with the subsequent marriages between Telegonus and Odysseus' wife Penelope and between Circe and Odysseus' son by Penelope, Telemachus.

Two of the extant fragments from the play refer to the oar Odysseus carried to appease the sea god Poseidon. Several extant fragments make reference to the oracle of Zeus at Dodona. Other than one reference in Trachiniae, these are the only extant references to Dodona in Sophocles' works. Classicist T.F. Hoey believes that the thematic development of Odysseus Acanthoplex was similar to that of Trachiniae. According to archaeologist Thomas B. L. Webster, the plot of Odysseus Acanthoplex had a diptych form, i.e., in two parts, analogous to Sophocles' extant Ajax, Trachiniae and Antigone.

Sutton speculated that the play partially unfolded as follows. Early in the play, Odysseus related the directions from Tiresias described in The Odyssey in which he was supposed to carry an oar far inland as a sacrifice to Poseidon. He also related an oracle he received at Dodona telling him that he would be killed by his son. Believing that the oracle referred to Telemachus, he would have taken precautions against Telemachus killing him, but was unprepared when another son who he did not know of arrived and a fight ensued. The wounded Odysseus was brought on stage lamenting his wounds and denouncing the oracle for failing to predict that he would die at the hands of this stranger. Then Telegonus arrived on stage, and a recognition scene occurred in which Telegonus discovered that he killed his father and Odysseus realized that the oracle had come to pass.

Webster, who believes that Niptra and Odysseus Acanthoplex are the same play, believes that the play began with Odysseus' return home to Ithaca and his recognition by Eurycleia, who in The Odyssey washed Odysseus' feet.

== Critical reception ==
In his Poetics, Aristotle used the plot of Odysseus Acanthoplex, under the title Odysseus Wounded, as one of three examples of an effective type of plot for tragedy in which a character performs a horrific deed to a relative in ignorance and only learns the truth after the fact. The other examples Aristotle gave of this type of effective plot were Sophocles' Oedipus Rex and a play about Alcmaeon by 4th century BCE tragic playwright Astydamas.

Roman philosopher Cicero praised Pacuvius' play Niptra, which was an imitation of Sophocles' Odysseus Acanthoplex, because in Pacuvius' play Odysseus does not lament his wounds excessively, as Cicero believed the character did in Sophocles' play.

== Date ==
In The Lost Sophocles, D. F. Sutton suggests that Odysseus Acanthoplex was possibly first produced by about 414 BCE, which Sutton suggests is the same timeframe as Sophocles' Electra. Webster believes it was produced at a date close to that of Women of Trachis, which he dates to sometime before 431, due to perceived similarities with the structure of that play.
