= International Society on Toxinology =

International Society on Toxinology (IST) is a global society of scientists and clinicians working for the advancement of venoms, poisons and toxins. It was founded in 1962 with an aim to advance knowledge on venoms, poisons and toxins of animal, plant and microbial origin.

== Origin ==
=== Pioneer research ===
In 1664 an Italian polymath Francesco Redi wrote his first monumental work Osservazioni intorno alle vipere (Observations about the Viper) in which he first elucidated the scientific basis of snakebite and venom of the viper. He showed that the venom is produced from the fang, it is not poisonous when swallowed, and dangerous only when it enters the bloodstream. He even showed how to stop or slow down the venom action in the blood by tight ligature before the wound. This work is heralded as the foundation of toxinology and the beginning of experimental toxicology.

=== Foundation ===
In 1962 a group of scientists and clinicians who have made significant contributions to toxinology joined forces to establish a working society. The Society had its first international meeting in 1966 in Atlantic City, USA. Findlay E. Russell was the first president of the Society.

== Organisation and Membership ==
The Society aims to advance knowledge on the properties of toxins and antitoxins and to bring together scholars interested in the field. Full membership is open to those who have published meritorious original investigations in toxinology, while persons who do not qualify for membership but are interested in the field of toxinology are eligible for associate membership. There is also student membership. World Congresses of the Society and Symposia of the IST-Sections (European, Pan-American, Asia-Pacific) are regularly organised to promote communication and exchange of results in toxinology research. The officers of the Society, the President and Secretary-Treasurer, are assisted by a Council and they all are elected by the members.

== Award ==
IST sponsors the Redi Award to honour scientists who have contributed distinguished work in the field of toxinology. This is the most prestigious award in the world in toxinology. The award is given at each World Congress of IST (generally held every three years) since 1967.

== Initiative ==
At the Asia-Pacific Section Congress in Vietnam in December 2008, a proposal by Prof David Warrell (recipient of the Redi Award 2012) that The Global Snakebite Initiative be formally endorsed as an official initiative of the IST was passed, and confirmed unanimously at the IST World Congress in Recife, Brazil, in March 2009. The Global Snakebite Initiative is the follow-up of the World Health Organization programme on snakebite as one of the Neglected Tropical Diseases.

== Publication ==
Toxicon is the official journal of the Society, started in 1963, and is now published monthly by Elsevier.
