= Foundation of Medical Professionals Alliance in Taiwan =

Taiwanese NGO

- 台灣醫界聯盟基金會
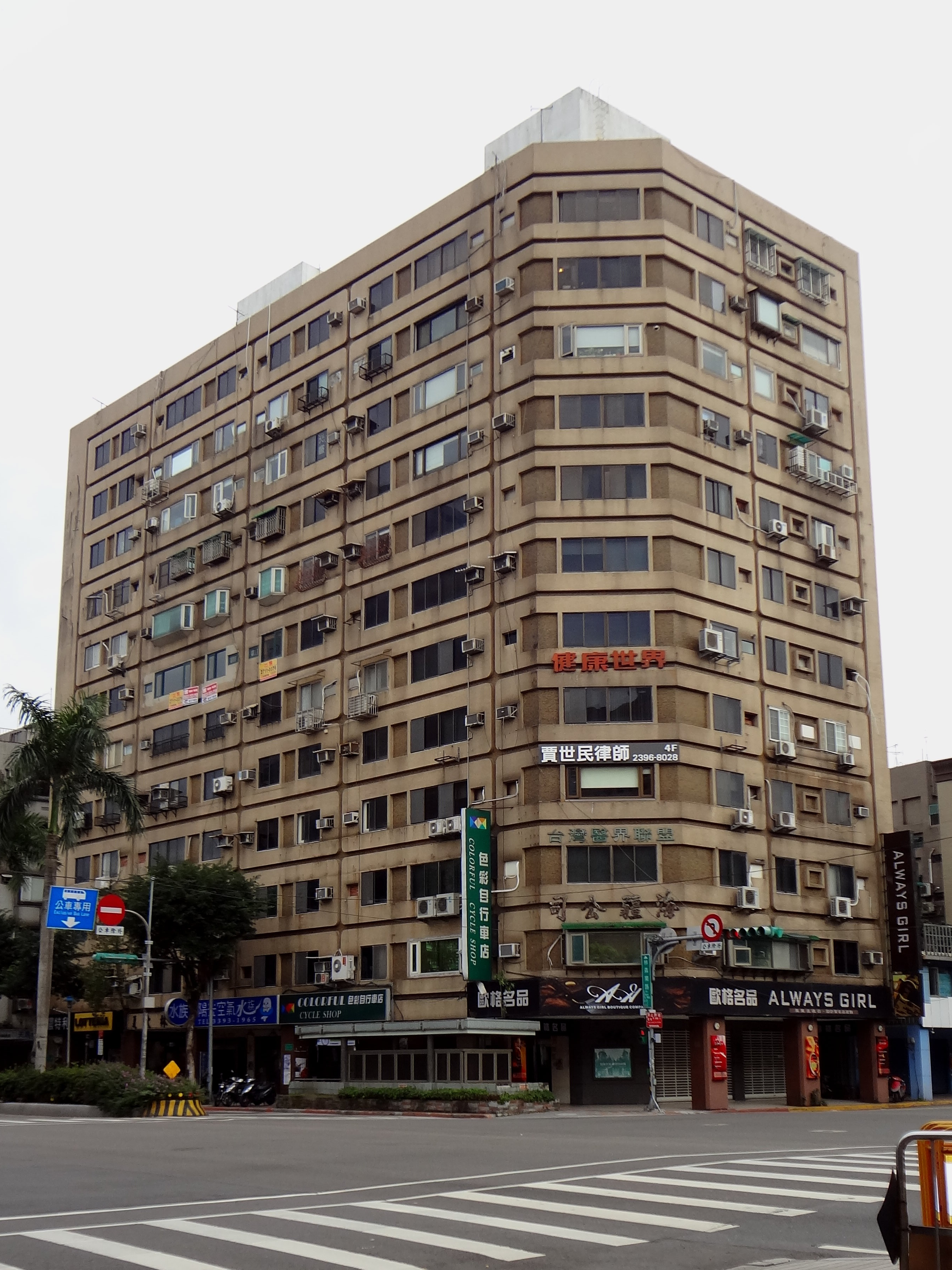
- Headquarters: Zhongzheng, Taipei, Taiwan
- Website: Official website

The Foundation of Medical Professionals Alliance in Taiwan (FMPAT; Chinese: 台灣醫界聯盟基金會; pinyin: Táiwān Yī Jiè Liánméng Jījīn Huì) is a non-governmental organization based in Taiwan.

== History ==
Dr Chen-Yuan Lee, a Taiwanese pharmacologist, professor emeritus of the College of Medicine of the National Taiwan University, former fellow of Academica Sinica, and an important political figure during the period of democratization of Taiwan founded the Medical Professionals Alliance in Taiwan on 1 March 1992. On 19 July 1992, the foundation gained its formal status as Foundation of Medical Professionals Alliance in Taiwan (FMPAT).

The first activity of the foundation was to push the Kuomintang and the president Lee Teng-hui(李登輝) to abolish the Sedition Punishment Act (懲治叛亂條例) and Article 100 of the Criminal Code of the Republic of China(中華民國刑法第100條). Since 1992, FMPAT has developed in Taiwan's medical profession a sense of social responsibility, medical training, biotech development and providing health-policy advice to the government. Today, it is one of the many groups trying to form relationships with international nongovernmental organizations to lobby for Taiwan's participation in the World Health Organization.

== Organization ==
Currently, the president of the FMPAT is Dr. Wu Shuh-min (吳樹民). The former legislator Lin Shih-chia is the chief executive officer of the foundation.

The board of directors and the board of supervisors elect standing directors and supervisors. The president, elected by standing directors, represents the foundation externally and manages its operations internally.

== Goals ==
By upholding humanitarianism, the foundation aims to unite medical professionals who are in passion of refining medical ethics and cultures in Taiwan, devote to issues and fields of human rights, policies of education, and environmental protection, enhance medicine professionalism, and upgrade clinical level.

== Membership of International Organizations ==
The foundation has been invited as a part of Global Health Diplomacy Network since 2010, devoted to the concept of Global Health Diplomacy, and has promoted dialogues between the fields of diplomacy and health profession.

During the campaign for Taiwan to rejionrejoin World Health Organization (WHO) from 1997 to 2008, it has lobbied for support of more than 20 countries. And since 2000, the foundation has also strived for opportunities for hosting meetings on APEC in Taiwan, such as Conferences of APEC Network on Pharmaceutical Regulatory Science held in 2000, 2001, and 2011

== See also ==
- Chen-Yuan Lee
- Observer status
