= American Academy of Clinical Toxicology =

The American Academy of Clinical Toxicology is a non-profit multidisciplinary health association that promotes research, education, prevention, and treatment of diseases caused by chemicals. Its membership consists of clinical and research toxicologists, physicians, veterinarians, nurses, pharmacists, analytical chemists, industrial hygienists, poison information center specialists, and allied professionals.

The brainchild of Eric Comstock, a physician from Texas who opened a clinical toxicology laboratory shortly after the passage of the Hazardous Substances Labeling Act (1960), the American Academy of Clinical Toxicology was founded in the United States in 1968 by a group of physicians and scientists who had a common interest in poisoning. In 1974, the academy played a crucial role in establishing the American Board of Medical Toxicology (today the American College of Medical Toxicology) to allow for physicians to be board certified as clinical toxicologists. (Clinical Toxicology was formally recognized by the American Board of Medical Specialties in 1992.) In 1985, it established the American Board of Applied Toxicology, which certifies non-physicians who are experts in toxicology.

== See also ==
- Clinical Toxicology, the official journal of the AACT
