= Findlay E. Russell =

American internal medicine physician and toxicologist

Findlay Ewing Russell (1 September 1919 – 21 August 2011) was an American internal medicine physician and toxicologist. He pursued a research interest in venomous and poisonous animals and the effects of toxins on the human nervous system and was widely acknowledged as one of the world's leading authorities on snakes and the pharmacology of snake venoms. Consulting work for the United Nations and various governmental agencies took him all over the world.

== Biography ==
Russell served as a U.S. Army medic in World War II. He graduated from Loma Linda University School of Medicine in 1951. As an intern at Los Angeles County General Hospital (now the Los Angeles County and USC Medical Center), Russell applied for a research fellowship in neurophysiology in the Biology Division at Caltech under Professor Anthonie Van Harreveld. He was a Caltech research fellow from 1951 to 1953. By 1953 he was publishing studies on the venom of stingrays and continued to study the venoms of many species throughout his career. His research on stingray venom was eventually supported by Office of Naval Research. His colleagues at Caltech included Howard Teas and Richard Schweets and he came under the influence Max Delbrück. Other associates included George Wells Beadle, Arie Jan Haagen-Smit and Nobelists William Shockley and Linus Pauling (he treated Pauling's dog with vitamin C injections). During this time he also taught students ballroom dancing and organized dances with Pasadena City College.

In 1953 Russell moved to the Huntington Institute of Medical Research at the Huntington Hospital in Pasadena. He left Huntington for a professorship at University of Southern California in 1955. He served as professor of neurology, biology and physiology at USC and as director of the Laboratory of Neurological Research and Venom Poisoning Center at Los Angeles County-USC Medical Center. He worked with Drs. Weil and Shubin in the USC Shock Research Unit developing protocols to use Anti-venom in allergic patients. This was critical as the anti-venom was horse serum based. Russell joined the faculty of the University of Arizona College of Pharmacy in 1981.

Throughout his career, he authored over 120 peer-reviewed publications and countless chapters on venoms in medical, pharmacological, and toxicological texts. He was instrumental in setting up the journal Toxicon in 1962 and he was an editor from 1962 until 1979. In collaboration with Paul R. Saunders, Russell organised an international symposium on animal toxins, held in Atlantic City in April 1966. It was attended by over 80 participants and the papers were published the following year.

Together with John Sullivan, Russell developed a method for the purification of antivenom that led to the licensure of Crotalidae Polyvalent Immune Fab (CroFab) for the treatment of pit viper bite.

He was known for his wit, his passion for steam engines and vintage cars, and his extensive collections of spiders, scorpions, and rattlesnakes. Russell died in August 2011, a few days before his 92nd birthday.

== Awards and accolades ==
- Honorary Doctor of Laws degree, University of California, Santa Barbara (1989)
- The UA College of Pharmacy established the Findlay E. Russell Distinguished Citizen Award in his honor and named him the first recipient in 1992
- Honorary member, Society of Toxicology (2000)
- Fulbright Scholar
- Consultant, World Health Organization, Doctors Without Borders, and the National Science Foundation

== Works ==
=== Articles ===
- Russell, Findlay E. (December 1960). "Snake Venom Poisoning in Southern California". Calif Med. 93 (6): 347–350. PMC 1578304. PMID 13744840.
- Russell, Findlay E. (1980). "Snake Venom Poisoning in the United States". Annual Review of Medicine. 31: 247–59. doi:10.1146/annurev.me.31.020180.001335. PMID 6994610.
- Russell, F (1987). "Another warning about electric shock for snakebite". Postgrad Med. 82 (5): 32. doi:10.1080/00325481.1987.11699990. PMID 3671201.
- Russell, F. E. (1990). "When a snake strikes"'". Emerg Med. 22 (12): 33–4, 37–40, 43.

=== Books ===
- Russell, F. E. and Richard S. Scharffenberg (1964), Bibliography of Snake Venoms and Venomous Snakes; Bibliographic Associates
- Russell, F. E. (1965), Marine Toxins and Venomous and Poisonous Marine Animals; Academic Press.
- Russell, F. E. (1983), Snake Venom Poisoning; Scholium Intl
- Russell, F. E. and Rachakonda Nagabushanam (1997), The Venomous and Poisonous Marine Invertebrates of the Indian Ocean; Science Pub Inc.
- Russell, F. E. and James R. Campbell (2015), "Venomous Terrestrial Snakes of the Middle East"; Edition Chimaira.
