= Clinical Toxicology =

- Discipline: Toxicology
- Language: English

Publication details
- Former name: Journal of Toxicology: Clinical Toxicology
- History: 1968–present
- Publisher: Taylor and Francis Group
- Frequency: Monthly
- Impact factor: 4.467 (2020)

Standard abbreviations
- ISO 4: Clin. Toxicol.
- NLM: Clin Toxicol (Phila)

Indexing
- ISSN: 1556-3650 (print); 1556-9519 (web)

Links
- Journal homepage

Clinical Toxicology (until 2005, Journal of Toxicology: Clinical Toxicology) is a peer-reviewed medical journal of clinical toxicology. It is published by Taylor and Francis and is the official journal of the American Academy of Clinical Toxicology, the European Association of Poisons Centres and Clinical Toxicologists, the American Association of Poison Control Centers and the Asia Pacific Association of Medical Toxicology. The editor-in-chiefs are Professor Robert S. Hoffman and Professor Allister Vale. The journal is published in 12 issues per year in simultaneous print and online editions.

According to the Journal Citation Reports, its 2024 Impact Factor is 3.3.
