= Postgraduate Medicine =

- Discipline: Medicine
- Language: English
- Edited by: Howard A. Miller

Publication details
- History: 1916–present
- Publisher: Informa Healthcare
- Frequency: Bimonthly

Standard abbreviations
- ISO 4: Postgrad. Med.

Indexing
- CODEN: POMDAS
- ISSN: 0032-5481 (print); 1941-9260 (web)
- LCCN: 49005806
- OCLC no.: 643598155

Links
- Journal page at publisher's website

Postgraduate Medicine is a bimonthly peer-reviewed medical journal published by Informa Healthcare. It was established in 1916 with Charles William Mayo as its first editor-in-chief. The current editor-in-chief is Howard A. Miller (Drexel University College of Medicine). The journal is directed towards primary care physicians. It is abstracted and indexed in Index Medicus/MEDLINE/PubMed, the Science Citation Index, and Current Contents/Clinical Medicine.
