= Clodomiro Picado Research Institute =

Instituto Clodomiro Picado
- Interactive map of Instituto Clodomiro Picado
- 09°58′59″N 84°00′48″W
- Location: San José Province; Costa Rica
- No. of animals: 70+ species
- Website: icp.cr

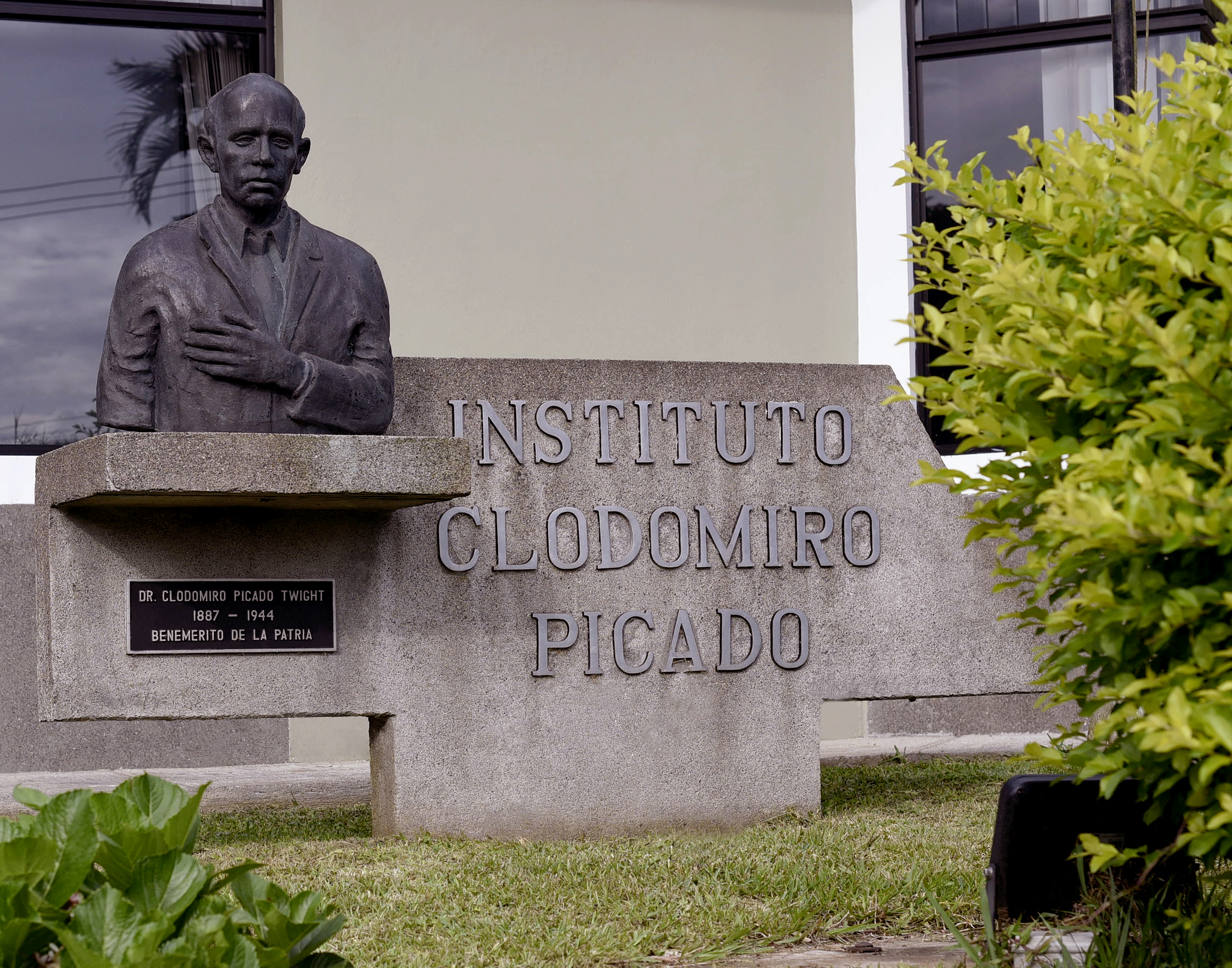
Statue outside the entrance

The Instituto Clodomiro Picado is a research center in Vázquez de Coronado, San José Province, Costa Rica. Established in 1970, the institute is a research unit of the Universidad de Costa Rica, responsible for the production of snake antiophidic serums and scientific research on serpents and their venoms, as well as educational and extension programs in rural areas and hospitals. It received its name in honor of Costa Rican scientist Clodomiro Picado Twight.

The Institute produces antivenoms for human and veterinary use in Central America, Ecuador, Nigeria, Sri Lanka, and Papua New Guinea.

== See also ==
- List of zoos by country: Costa Rica zoos
