= America's Poison Centers =

American nonprofit organization

America's Poison Centers (formerly known as American Association of Poison Control Centers - AAPCC) is a national nonprofit organization founded in 1958 that represents the nation's 53 poison centers. America's Poison Centers supports Poison Centers in their public health mission to prevent poisonings, provide education, conduct scientific research and treat individuals exposed to poisoning from medications, environmental events, plants, animals, and household products or toxins. America's Poison Centers also supports the efforts of Poison Centers and interested individuals to reduce morbidity and mortality from unintentional poisonings. America's Poison Centers sets standards for Poison Center operations and certifies specialists in poison information who are available 24/7 to respond to public, health-care provider and emergency medical service personnel requests for assistance. In addition, America's Poison Centers maintains the National Poison Data System (NPDS), the only near real-time poison information and surveillance database in the United States.

== Poison Centers ==
Poison Centers have been providing vital poison exposure and information services in the United States for more than 70 years. Answering close to three million calls a year, centers save countless lives and millions of tax dollars.

Currently, there are 53 Poison Centers in the U.S. that collectively serve all 50 states, the District of Columbia, Puerto Rico, the Federated States of Micronesia, American Samoa, the U.S. Virgin Islands, and Guam.

=== Poison Help Hotline: 1-800-222-1222 ===
Poison Centers provide free, confidential, and expert medical advice via the Poison Help hotline: 1-800-222-1222. Each Poison Center answers calls to Poison Help from a designated geographic area, including calls from the public, hospitals, EMTs, and other health care providers. All calls are answered by physicians, pharmacists, nurses, and other medical professionals with specific training in toxicology. This free and confidential service operates 24 hours a day, every day of the year.

Poison Centers provide free, confidential, expert advice via the 24-hour national toll-free Poison Help line. Poison Centers provide immediate poison information and emergency instructions to all callers regardless of health insurance, immigration status, or language preference from any U.S. telephone or cell phone. Calls are answered by physicians, nurses and pharmacists with highly specialized training in poison management. Poison Center services are accessible to all populations, including under-served and undocumented groups, those speaking one of 150 languages and those utilizing telecommunication devices for the hearing-impaired (TDD/TTY). More than 70 percent of all cases received by Poison Centers can be safely and effectively treated at home, without need for further medical care.

=== Cost Savings for the Health-Care System ===
Substantial cost savings have been attributed to Poison Center reductions in unnecessary emergency department (ED) care through accurate assessment and triage of poisoning exposures. The public health and cost benefits from Poison Center pre-hospital management of patients not needing ED visits favorably impacts the self-pay or co-paying general public, the health-care institution supporting the costs of indigent care, the commercial insurance companies and governmental health-care funding agencies. Poison Centers assess and manage more than 70 percent of poison exposures over the phone, eliminating the need for callers to seek further medical care. This reduction in medically unnecessary ED visits decreases hospital overcrowding and minimizes unnecessary ambulance runs, freeing critical emergency staff to handle true emergencies more effectively.

== National Poison Data System (NPDS) ==
America's Poison Centers owns and manages a large database of information from all poison exposure and information case phone calls to all Poison Centers across the country. It is the only near real-time, comprehensive poisoning surveillance database in the United States.

NPDS holds more than 53 million poison exposure case records, with more than 2.5 million new records added each year. It is also a robust and modern system – holding technical medical information that is searchable in many ways. NPDS contains exposure cases dating back to 1985. Today, information and exposure case data is continually uploaded to NPDS from all the Poison Centers in near “real time.”

NPDS can:

- Guide clinical research on poisonings.
- Prompt new product and medicine formulas.
- Help provide evidence for product repackaging, recalls, bans, over-the-counter status changes, product reformulation.
- Focus poison prevention education.
- Direct training of future medical students.
- Detect chemical or bioterrorism incidents.

Key regulatory agencies that rely on NPDS data:

- Centers for Disease Control and Prevention (CDC)
- Food and Drug Administration (FDA)
- Environmental Protection Agency (EPA)
- Drug Enforcement Administration (DEA)
- Consumer Product Safety Commission (CPSC)

NPDS data is also frequently used by pharmaceutical manufacturers.

== See also ==
- Clinical Toxicology, the official journal of America's Poison Centers.
