= Groovy Rednecks =

- Origin: Los Angeles California, United States
- Genres: Alternative country
- Years active: 1991–present
- Members: Tex Troester; Bob Ricketts; Steve Seifert; Chris Bailey
- Past members: Hermann Senac; Jim Doyle; Chris Kirshbaum; Mike Wilcox; Ron Botelho; Grandpa Pete Deyoung

The Groovy Rednecks are an alt-country band from Los Angeles, California, who refer to themselves as being a "country band for people who hate country" and a "Drinkin' Band". The Rednecks consist of vocalist/lyricist Tex Troester, guitarist Bob Ricketts, bassist Steve Seifert, drummer Chris Baily and guitarist Gary Riley.

Since forming in 1991, the Rednecks have played over 900 shows. The band has been considered a top LA Country Band for decades, was named a Top-10 LA Country/Americana band in 2017, and has been featured on the cover and in an in-depth story in the LA Weekly. They record for the label "Chicken Fried Steaks" and have been extolled for their "...wild, hootin’ and hollerin’ country rock..." As of 2020, they've released five CDs.

== Members ==
- Tex Troester – Vocals (founder)
- Bob Ricketts – Guitar
- Steve Seifert - Bass
- Gary Riley – Guitar / mandolin
- Chris Bailey - Drums

== Discography ==
- 1997: Buzzed
- 1999: Wishful Drinking
- 2003: Ass Grabbin’ Country
- 2006: Loud Mouth Drunks
- 2013: Tawdry Tales
