= American College of Medical Toxicology =

- Abbreviation: ACMT
- Predecessor: American Board of Medical Toxicology (ABMT)
- Formation: 1993
- Type: Professional association
- Purpose: Support quality medical care for persons exposed to harmful chemicals, provide training to physicians
- Services: Training, Education, Database Maintenance
- Fields: Medical Toxicology
- Official language: English
- Publication: Journal of Medical Toxicology
- Subsidiaries: Medical Toxicology Foundation
- Affiliations: American Board of Emergency Medicine, American Board of Pediatrics, American Board of Preventive Medicine
- Website: www.acmt.net

The American College of Medical Toxicology is a professional association of medical toxicologists that was founded in 1993. Its aim is to support quality medical care for persons exposed to potentially harmful chemicals (whether medications, drugs of abuse, workplace or environmental toxins, or bioterrorism agents), and to provide training and insight to the physicians who provide this care.

== History ==
Timeline of the organization:

- 1974: American Board of Medical Toxicology (ABMT) established
- 1992: Medical Toxicology recognized by American Board of Medical Specialties
- 1993: ABMT goes out of business and is replaced by ACMT and the Subboard of Medical Toxicology. Subboard members include representatives appointed by the American Board of Emergency Medicine, American Board of Pediatrics, and the American Board of Preventive Medicine
- 1993: ACMT is incorporated as stand alone professional organization for physician toxicologists board certified in medical toxicology
- 1994: Subboard offers first certification examination in Medical Toxicology
- 2001: Accreditation Council for Graduate Medical Education accredits Medical Toxicology fellowship training programs
- 2002: First ACMT Annual Spring Conference
- 2003: ACMT/Agency for Toxic Substances and Disease Registry Regional Consultation Network is established
- 2004: First of over 50 courses a Chemical Agents of Opportunity offered with sponsorship of the ATSDR
- 2004: First biannual ACMT Board Review Course offered
- 2005: Publication of the Journal of Medical Toxicology
- 2009: Establishment of the Medical Toxicology Foundation

== Activities ==
The organization maintains the Toxicology Investigators Consortium database that catalogs HIPAA-compliant data regarding the clinical management of poisoned patients.

== Journal ==
The ACMT publishes the peer-reviewed medical journal Journal of Medical Toxicology.
