= Toxicon =

- Discipline: Toxinology
- Language: English
- Edited by: Ray Norton

Publication details
- History: 1962–present
- Publisher: Elsevier
- Frequency: 16/year
- Impact factor: 3.033 (2020)

Standard abbreviations
- ISO 4: Toxicon

Indexing
- CODEN: TOXIA6
- ISSN: 0041-0101 (print); 1879-3150 (web)
- OCLC no.: 1767658

Links
- Journal homepage; Online access; Journal page at society website

Toxicon is a peer-reviewed scientific journal of toxinology and the official journal of the International Society on Toxinology and the North American Society of Toxinology. It is published by Elsevier and the editor-in-chief is Ray Norton. It aims to publish original research, novel findings, and review papers on toxins and their chemical, toxicological, pharmacological, and immunological properties.

The journal was established in 1962. According to the Journal Citation Reports, Toxicon has a 2020 impact factor of 3.033.
