= Toxinology =

Subfield dealing with animal, plant, and microbial toxins

Toxinology is a subfield of toxicology dedicated to toxic substances produced by or occurring in living organisms.
