= Atroxase =

Identifiers
- EC no.: 3.4.24.43
- CAS no.: 181186-94-7

Databases
- IntEnz: IntEnz view
- BRENDA: BRENDA entry
- ExPASy: NiceZyme view
- KEGG: KEGG entry
- MetaCyc: metabolic pathway
- PRIAM: profile
- PDB structures: RCSB PDB PDBe PDBsum
Search
- PMC: articles
- PubMed: articles
- NCBI: proteins

Atroxase (EC 3.4.24.43) is an enzyme. This enzyme catalyses the following chemical reaction

Cleavage of His^{5}-Leu, Ser^{9}-His, His^{10}-Leu, Ala^{14}-Leu and Tyr^{16}-Leu of insulin B chain

This endopeptidase is present in the venom of the western diamondback rattlesnake (Crotalus atrox).
