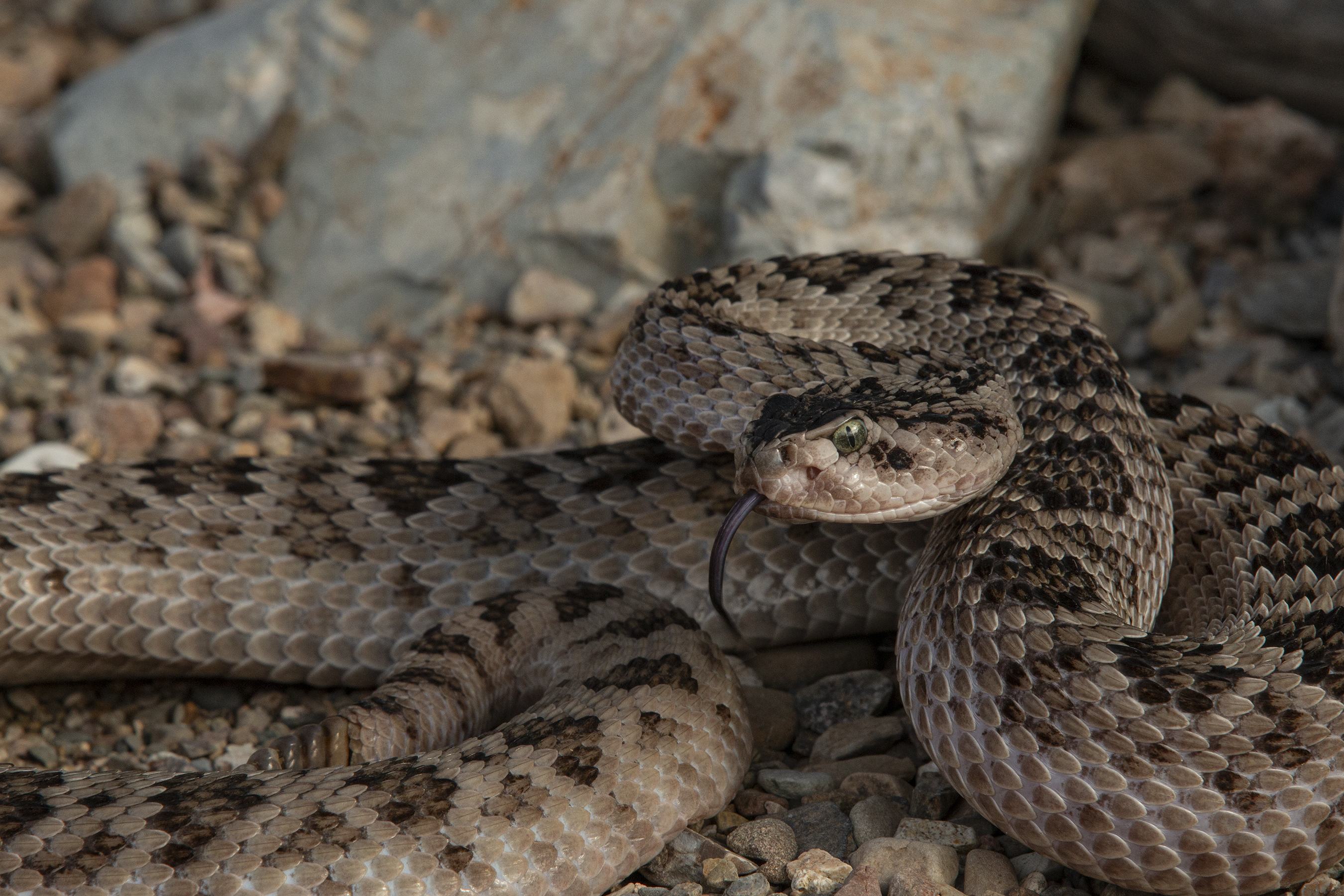

Scientific classification
- Kingdom: Animalia
- Phylum: Chordata
- Class: Reptilia
- Order: Squamata
- Suborder: Serpentes
- Family: Viperidae
- Genus: Crotalus
- Species: C. scutulatus
- Subspecies: C. s. salvini

Trinomial name
- Crotalus scutulatus salvini Günther, 1895
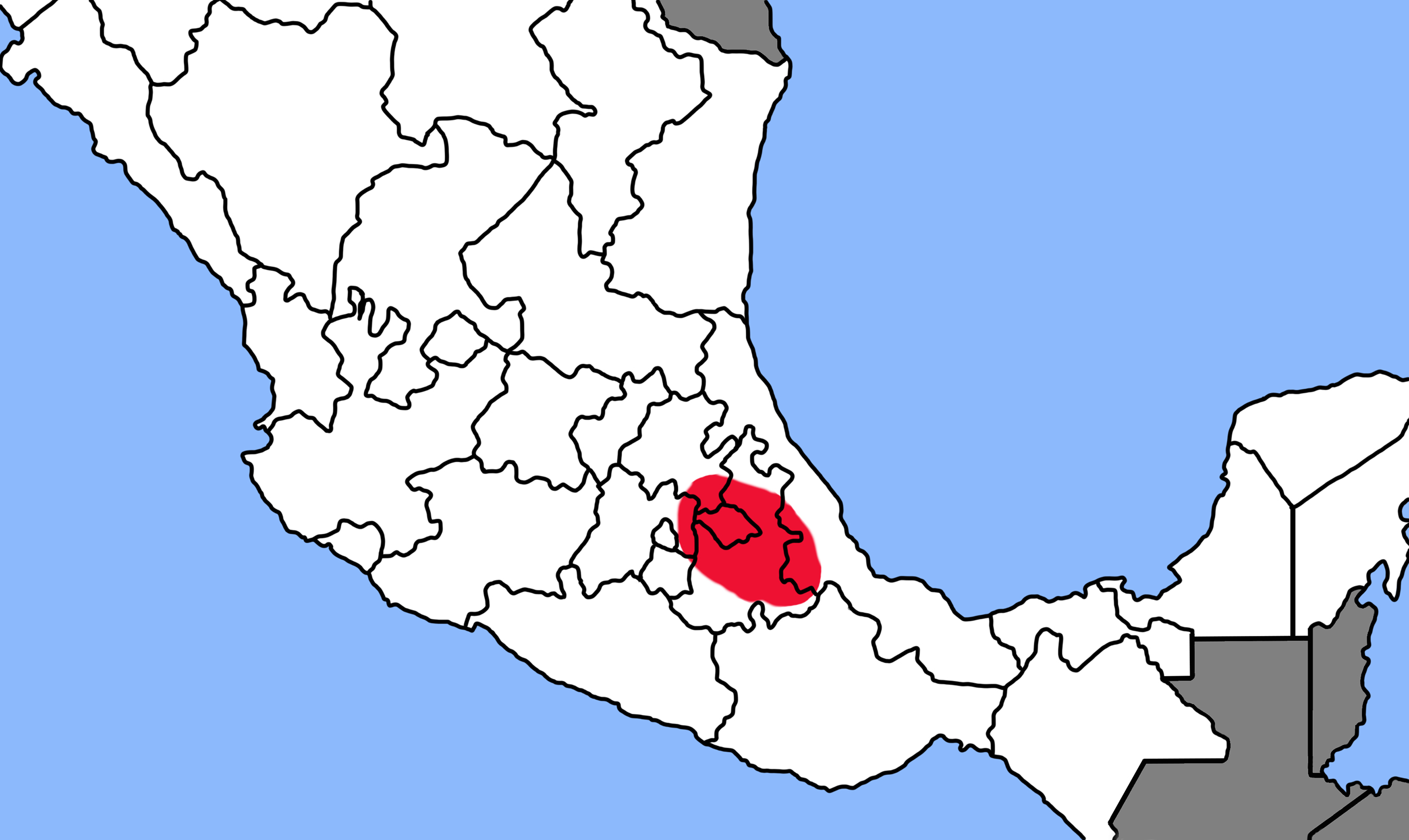

= Crotalus scutulatus salvini =

Subspecies of snake

Crotalus scutulatus salvini, commonly known as the Huamantlan rattlesnake, is a venomous pit viper, currently classified as a subspecies of C. scutulatus that is found in mainland Mexico, at the southern end of the distribution of C. scutulatus. The subspecific epithet honors the nineteenth century British naturalist Osbert Salvin.

== Description ==
The original description includes, "On the basis of present knowledge this subspecies differs from C. s. scutulatus in having less subdivision of the scales of the crown, a lower number of ventrals, and a less vivid coloration."

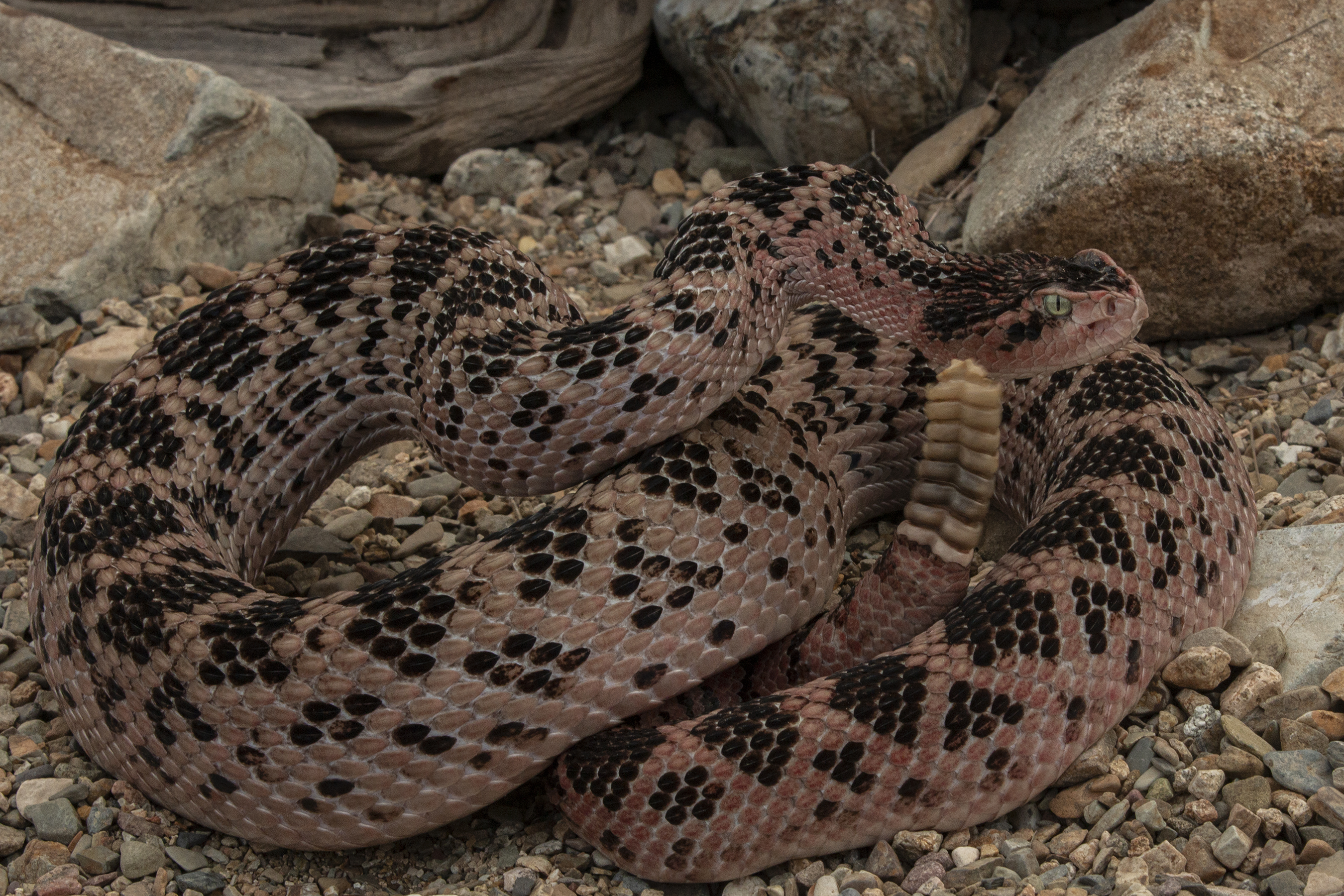
Huamantlan rattlesnake showing transient red color of some individuals.

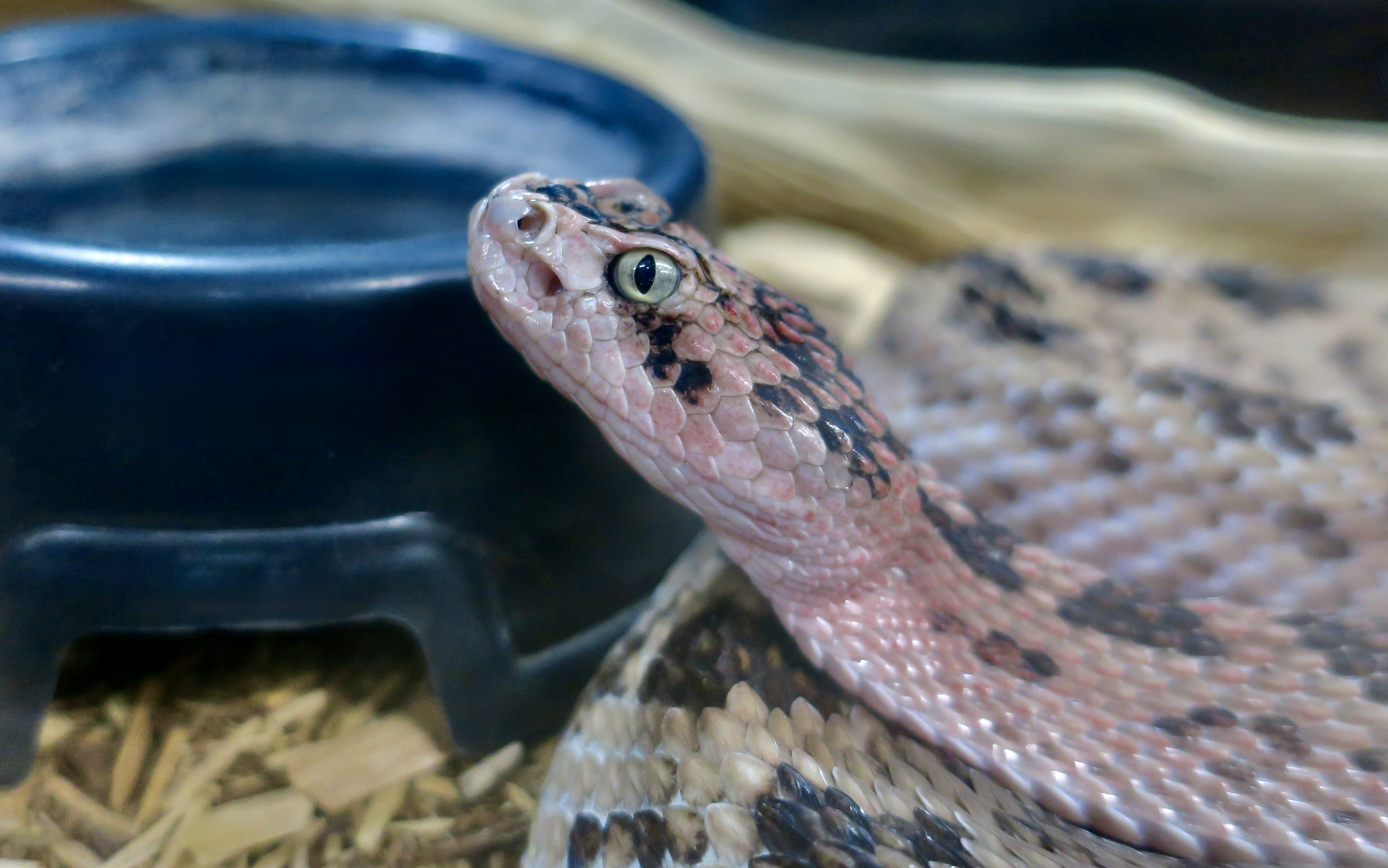
A red Huamantlan rattlesnake at Rattlesnake Ranch, Arizona.

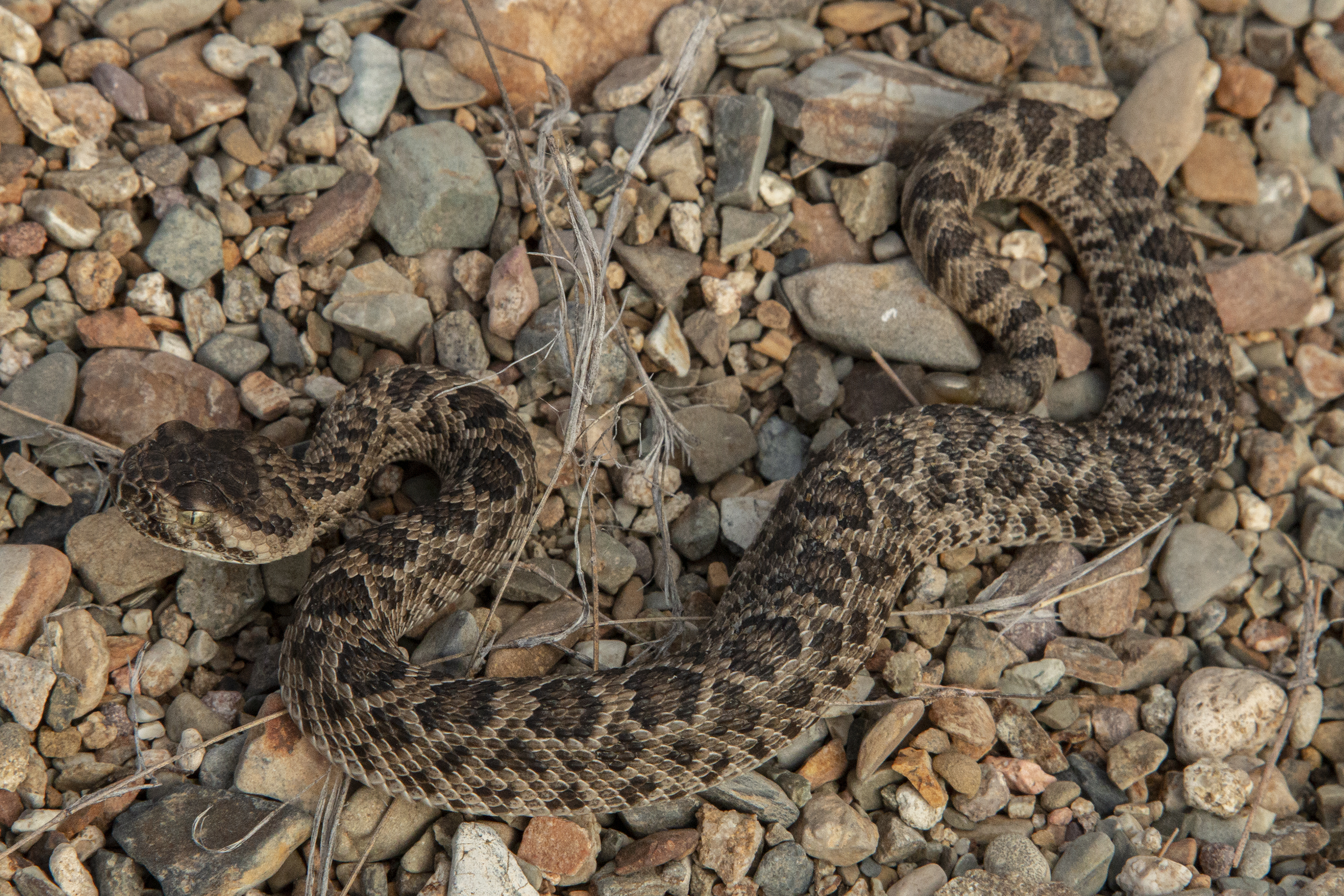
Four-day-old Huamantlan rattlesnake

Compared to C. s. scutulatus, C. s. salvini is distinguished by higher contrast markings with darker dorsal rhombs on very pale background color, with colors of the pale and dark caudal rings matching the body hues. Most specimens lack pale borders surrounding the dorsal rhombs. Many animals lack significant color, but some have a reddish hue to the face and, less frequently, over part or most of the body. The dorsal scales are prominently keeled and rough in appearance. The iris of the eyes is usually quite pale, often yellowish.

== Geographic range ==
Crotalus scutulatus salvini is found in mostly arid scrub habitat, as well as adjacent grassland and foothills, from the State of Hidalgo, south through Tlaxcala and Puebla, to southwestern Veracruz, Mexico.

== Type specimen ==
The type specimen is British Natural History Museum (NHMUK) catalogue number 1946.1.19.35 (other catalogue number: NHMUK:ecatalogue:3637104). It is a syntype specimen that was donated by T.M. Rymer-Jones. The type status was later amended to lectotype.

== Type locality ==
The type locality for this subspecies is Huamantla, Tlaxcala, Mexico.

== Recent genetic and morphological analyses ==
Robust genetic analyses have revealed the population structure of C. scutulatus throughout the species' range, correlating genetic evidence of isolation and subsequent secondary contact of subpopulations with corresponding geologic and climatic events. As a result, four genetically distinct clades among present-day C. scutulatus have been described.

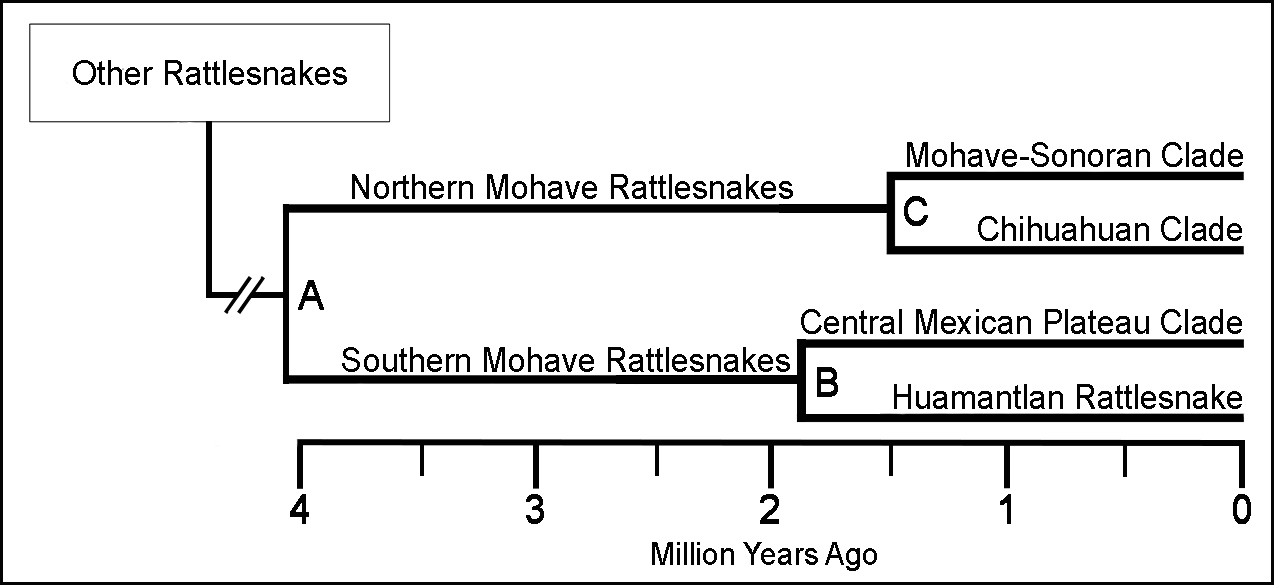
Phylogenetic tree of Crotalus scutulatus. Divergence of Northern Clade from the Southern Clade (A), the Huamantlan rattlesnake from the Central Mexican Plateau Clade (B), and the Mojave-Sonoran Clade from the Chihuahuan Clade (C).

The earliest split occurred at the northern margin of the Central Mexican Plateau about 4.1 million years ago (MYA), separating the species into northern and southern subpopulations. Then about 1.8 MYA, the subpopulation now identified as C. scutulatus salvini diverged genetically from the animals on the Central Mexican Plateau. Most recently, the northern subpopulation was divided at the Continental Divide (Cochise Filter) about 1.5 MYA, creating the Mojave-Sonoran clade to the west and the Chihuahuan clade to the southeast. Note that the boundaries between these clades correspond to elevational clines where climatic shifts during Pleistocene glacial advances and retreats likely isolated the subpopulations during cold periods but allowed secondary contact and resumption of gene flow during warmer periods, including the present.

These analyses indicate that the Central Mexican Plateau clade is more closely related (i.e., more recently shared a common ancestor) to the Huamantlan Rattlesnake (currently C. scutulatus salvini) than it is to the northern (Mojave-Sonoran and Chihuahuan) clades, suggesting that the designation of salvini as a subspecies of all other C. scutulatus is problematic.

More recently, qualitative, meristic, and morphometric traits from 347 specimens of C. scutulatus were analyzed, producing the conclusion that the species "is phenotypically cohesive without discrete subgroups, and that morphology follows a continuous cline in primary color pattern and meristic traits across the major axis of its expansive distribution," suggesting that "multiple episodes of isolation and secondary contact among metapopulations during the Pleistocene were sufficient to produce distinctive genetic populations, which have since experienced gene flow to produce clinal variation in phenotypes without discrete or diagnosable distinctions among these original populations." It was recommended that, for taxonomic purposes, Crotalus scutulatus "be retained as a single species, although it is possible that C. s. salvini, which is morphologically the most distinctive population, could represent a peripheral isolate in the initial stages of speciation."
