= Tortuga Island, Baja California Sur =

Island of Mexico in the Gulf of California

Isla Tortuga
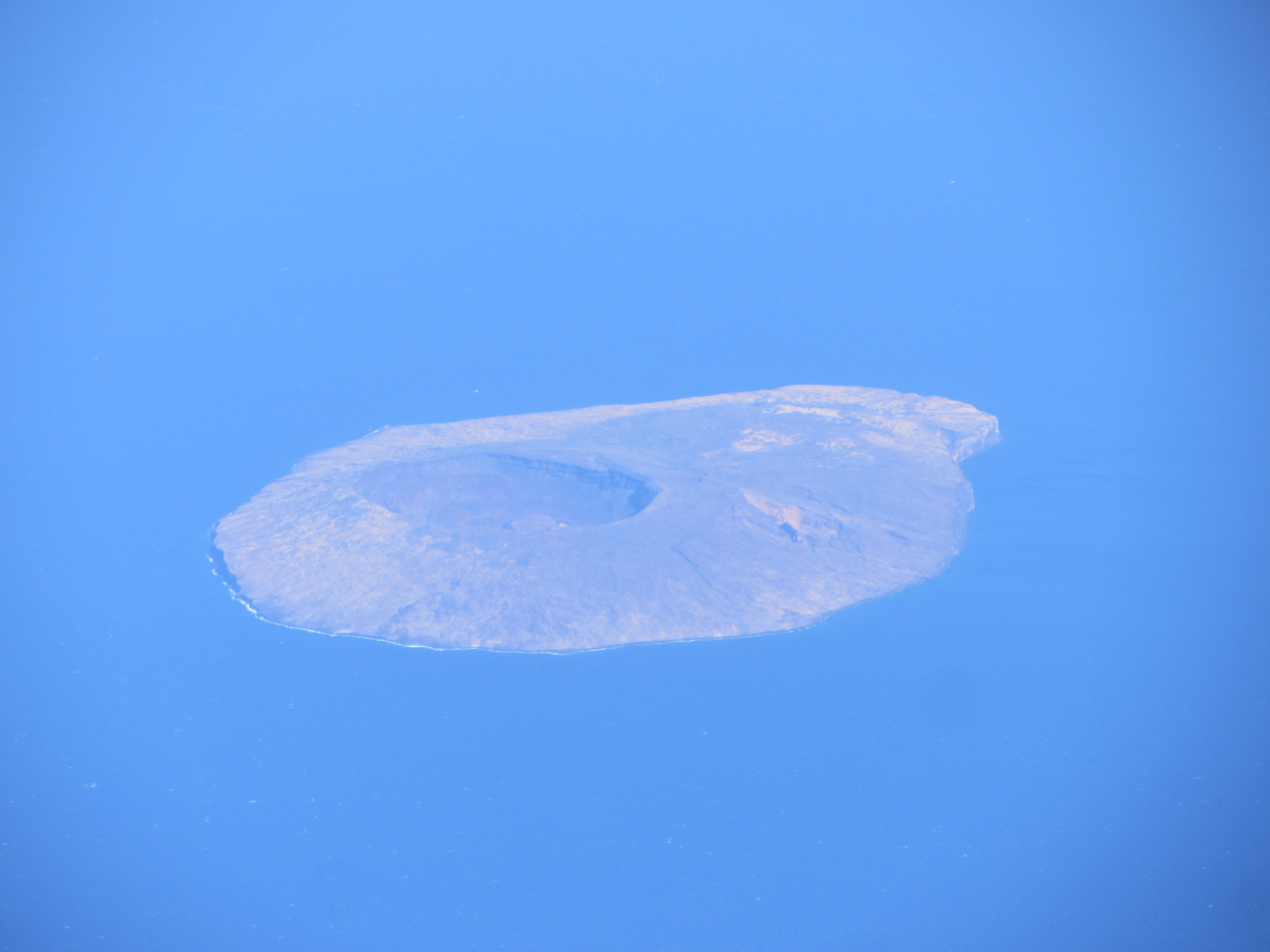

- Location within Mexico

Geography
- Location: Gulf of California
- Coordinates: 27°26′42″N 111°52′51″W

Administration
- Mexico
- State: Baja California Sur

Demographics
- Population: uninhabited

Isla Tortuga (Tortuga Island) is an island in the Gulf of California, created relatively recently in geologic terms by the volcanism associated with the East Pacific Rise. It lies east-northeast of the city of Santa Rosalía, in Mulegé Municipality. It has a surface area of 11.374 km^{2} (4.39 sq mi).

== Biology ==
The Tortuga Island rattlesnake (Crotalus tortugensis) is a species endemic to Isla Tortuga — it is found nowhere else. It is very abundant on the island and found everywhere on the island, except in the caldera of the volcano.
