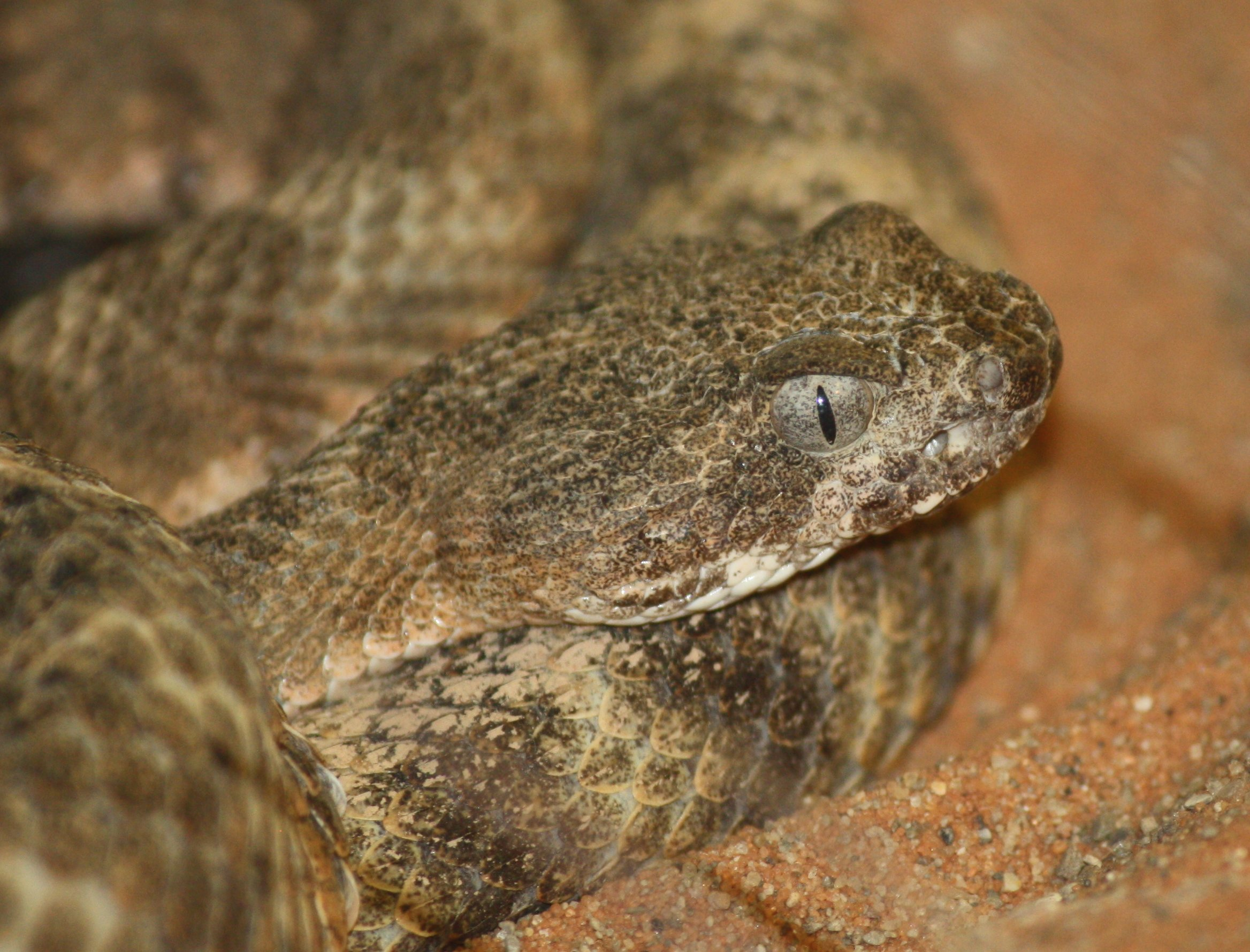

Conservation status
- Least Concern (IUCN 3.1)

Scientific classification
- Kingdom: Animalia
- Phylum: Chordata
- Class: Reptilia
- Order: Squamata
- Suborder: Serpentes
- Family: Viperidae
- Genus: Crotalus
- Species: C. tigris

Binomial name
- Crotalus tigris Kennicott, 1859
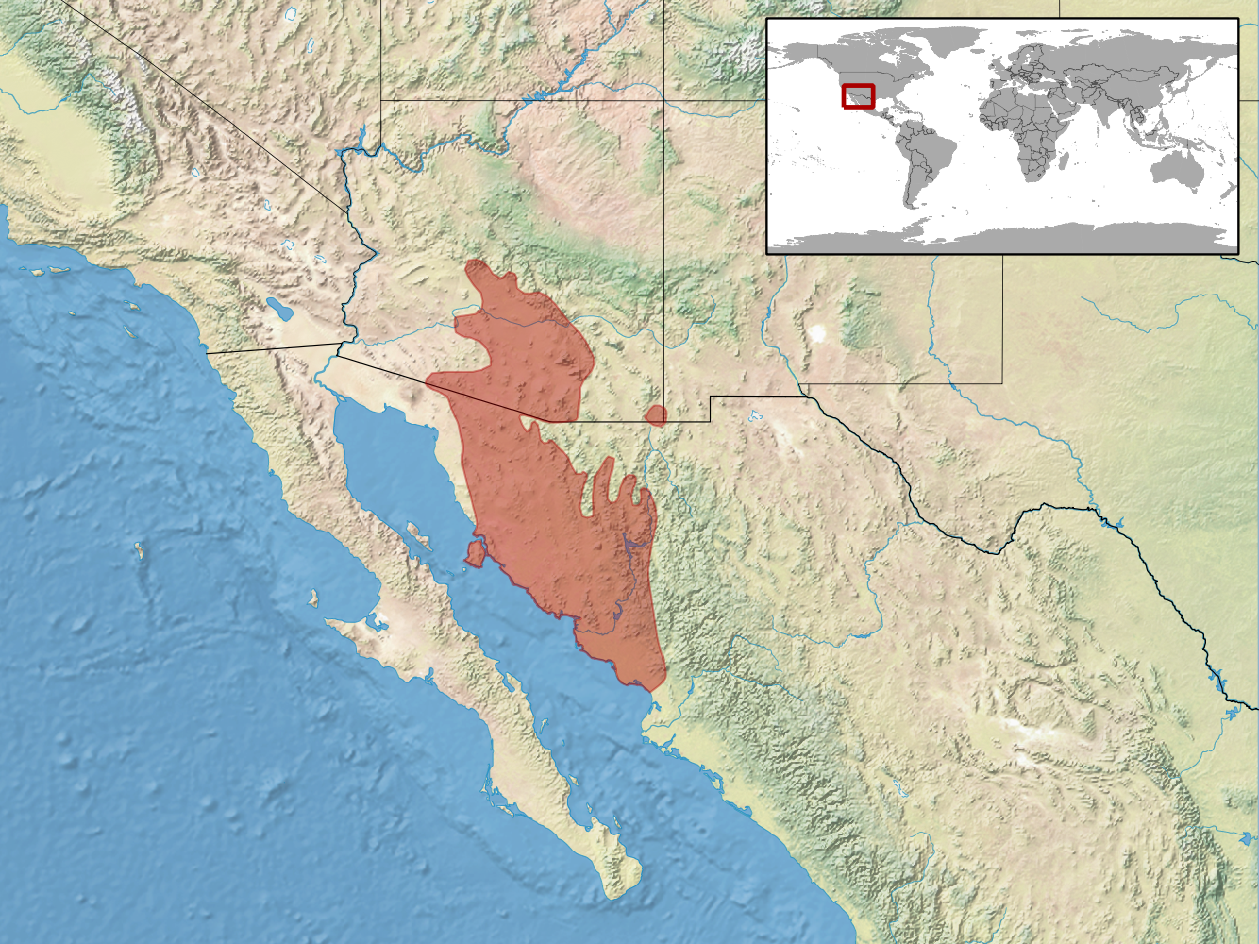

Synonyms
- Crotalus tigris Kennicott In Baird, 1859; C[audisona]. tigris – Cope, 1867; Crotalus tigris tigris – Amaral, 1929; Matteoea tigris – Hoser, 2009

= Tiger rattlesnake =

Species of snake

The tiger rattlesnake (Crotalus tigris) is a highly venomous pit viper species found in the southwestern United States and northwestern Mexico. No subspecies are currently recognized. The specific name tigris, (Latin for 'tiger'), refers to the many narrow dorsal crossbands, which create a pattern of vertical stripes when viewed from the side.

== Taxonomy ==
American herpetologist Robert Kennicott described the tiger rattlesnake in 1859. Common names include tiger rattlesnake and tiger rattler.

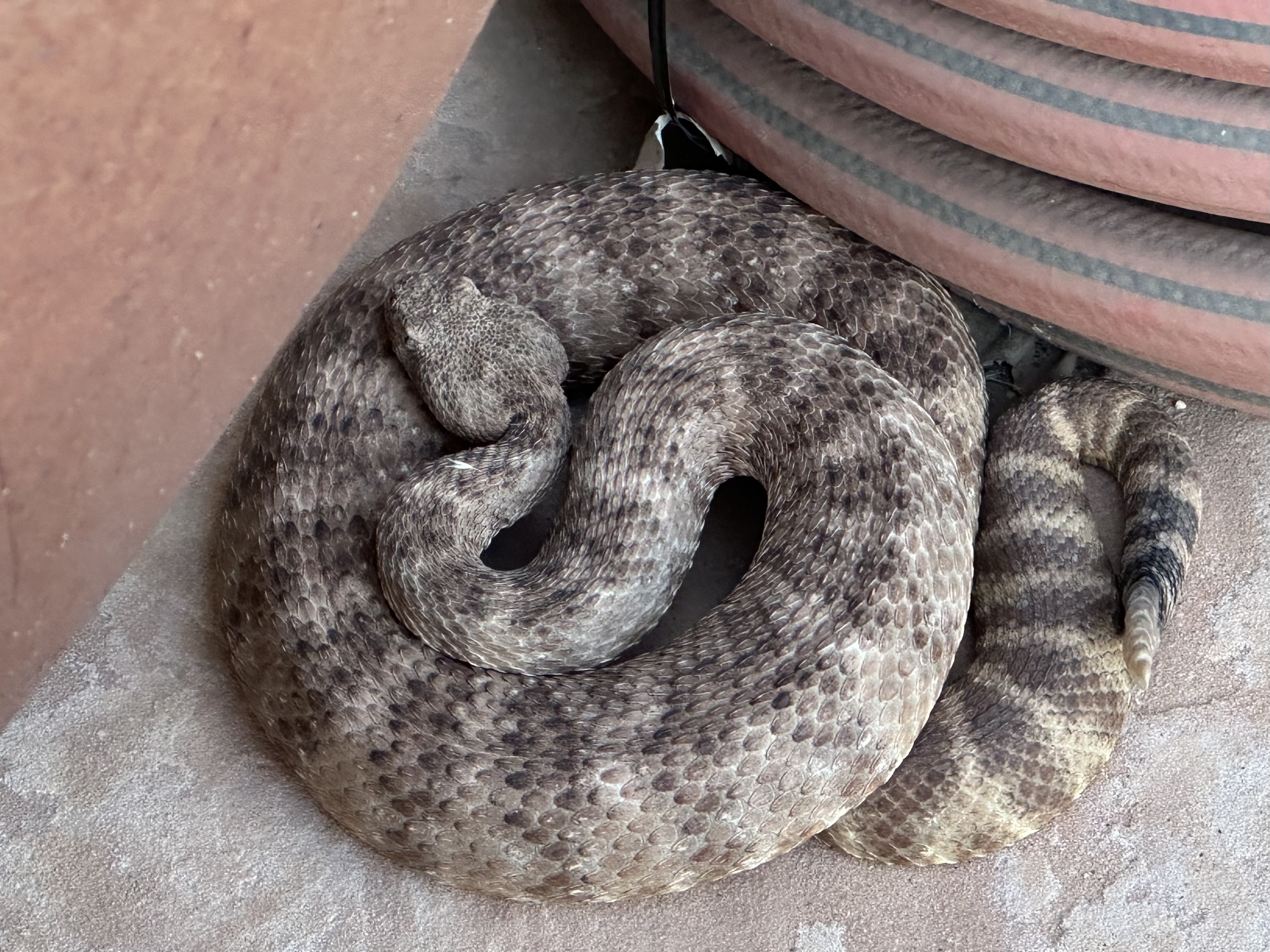
Tiger Rattlesnake, Mummy Mountain, Paradise Valley, Arizona

== Description ==
The tiger rattlesnake is easily identified by its small, spade-shaped head, which is about 1/25 of its total body length. It has the smallest head of any rattlesnake, and a large rattle. The color pattern consists of a gray, lavender, blue-gray, pink, or buff ground color that usually turns to pink, pale orange, or cream on the sides. Tiger rattlesnakes are the only rattlesnake with crossbands on the anterior portion of their bodies, with a series of 35 to 52 gray, olive, or brown bands across the dorsum consisting mainly of heavy punctations. These crossbands have vague borders and are wider dorsally than laterally. Also mid-dorsally, the crossbands become wider than the spaces that separate them. Posteriorly, the crossbands become darker and more clearly defined. They have six to 10 posterior rings. The markings on the head are mostly vague and irregular, although towards the rear of the head, a few dark markings may be arranged as paired occipital blotches and upper temporal streaks. The most distinguishable mark on the head is a dark cheek strip. Dorsal scales are keeled and in 21 to 27 rows. A relatively small species, individuals can weigh as much as 454 g (16.0 oz) and can range in length from 460 to 910 mm (18 to 36 in), with an average length of 609 mm (24.0 in). The largest specimen on record measured 88.5 cm (34.8 in) (Klauber, 1956), until H.M. Smith and Brodie (1982) reported a maximum length of 91.2 cm (35.9 in). Females have 164 to 177 ventral scales, and males have 158 to 172 ventral scales. Females have 16 to 21 caudal scales, and males have 23 to 27 caudal scales and are typically larger than females. They have relatively small eyes with elliptical pupils.

== Distribution and habitat ==
The species' range extends from central Arizona south through south-central Arizona in the United States, to southern Sonora, Mexico, including Isla Tiburón in the Gulf of California and was recently discovered in the southern Peloncillo Mountains of Arizona. The type locality is described as "Sierra Verde and Pozo Verde". The latter is a spring located on the Sonora side of the US-Mexico border, near Sasabe. According to Stejneger (1893), this spring is on the western slope of the southern Sierra Verde, which is also known as the Sierra del Pozo Verde. In these areas, the tiger rattlesnake is observed at elevations from sea level to about 1,465 m (4,806 ft) Reported occurrences at higher elevations have not been confirmed.

Tiger rattlesnakes habitats include rocky desert canyons, foothills, and bajadas, in vegetation zones ranging from thornscrub, ocotillo-mesquite-creosote bush, saguaro-paloverde, mesquite grassland, and chaparral to tropical deciduous forest (southern Sonora) and the lower edge of oak woodland. In southeastern Arizona, this snake occurs strictly in rocky areas in winter and spring, but uses edges of arroyos in summer. It is a terrestrial species, but may climb into low vegetation.

Tiger rattlesnakes have also often been observed in the foothills, rocky canyons, and ravines of deserts or mesquite grasslands from 1,000 to 5,000 ft (300 to 1,520 m) in elevation, throughout their geographic range. They rattlesnakes also inhabit escarpments, outcroppings, and cliff faces in thorny scrub desert habitat. In southeastern Arizona, mean home range size was 3.48 ha (0.0134 sq mi), and individuals moved an average of 33 m (108 ft) per day during the active season.

Little information is available concerning the average home range size of tiger rattlesnakes. One study reported an observed home range of about 3.5 km^{2} (1.4 sq mi).

== Behavior ==
Tiger rattlesnakes are terrestrial snakes and are nocturnal during the hot summer (June–August), but become diurnal and crepuscular during the fall season. They hibernate during the late fall and winter in rock crevices or animal burrows. In spite of being ground-dwelling, their activity is not restricted to the ground. They swim readily and have been found in bushes 60 cm (24 in) above the ground. Little information is available concerning communication and perception among tiger rattlesnakes. However, like other pit vipers, tiger rattlesnakes have heat-sensing pits (located on each side of the face between the eye and nostril) to detect warm-blooded predators and prey.

This snake is inactive in cold temperatures (December/January) and extreme heat (July/August). It may be active both day and night; daytime activity consists mainly of basking on cool days. These snakes are often observed being active after warm rains. In southeastern Arizona, they are active mainly from March to October.

== Diet ==
Tiger rattlesnakes generally feed on mammals such as rodents, but they have also been known to prey on lizards. The tiger rattlesnake ambushes much of its prey, but also actively hunts for small rodents and lizards, with juveniles relying heavily on lizards and adults depending more on rodents. In addition, these small rattlesnakes have been known to eat fairly large prey, including pocket mice, kangaroo rats, deer mice, packrats, and even spiny lizards. This species' venom is considered the most toxic of all rattlesnakes, and contains a myotoxin known to cause muscle necrosis and a neurotoxin similar to Mojave toxin. Like all pit vipers, tiger rattlesnakes inject venom into prey through long, hollow, retractable fangs. If envenomated prey crawls into a small crevice, this species is especially suited for extracting it due to its unusually small head.

== Predators ==
Little to no information is available regarding predators specific to tiger rattlesnakes. However, likely predators include hawks, eagles, coyotes, and other snakes. Their cryptic coloration helps camouflage them from potential predators and helps reduce risk of predation. If disturbed, they rapidly shake their rattles and may strike in defense. Tiger rattlesnakes are known to have an irascible temperament.

== Reproduction ==
Tiger rattlesnakes are polygynandrous, and either the male, female, or both have more than one mate within a single breeding season. Little else is known of the reproductive behavior of this species. The reproductive behavior of this species is thought to be similar to that of C. atrox and C. scutulatus. Copulation in viperids can take minutes, hours, or days, and can occur several times within a few days.

Tiger rattlesnake females follow a biennial reproductive cycle. Males follow a seasonal reproductive cycle, where sperm is stored in the vasa deferentia during winter. Breeding occurs from late May to mid-August, during the summer monsoon season. Like the majority of rattlesnakes, tiger rattlesnakes are ovoviviparous. Mean clutch size for is five young. The smallest known sexually reproducing female measured 541 mm (21.3 in; 54.1 cm) snout-vent length, while the smallest mature male measured 512 mm (20.2 in; 51.2 cm),

Generally, rattlesnakes invest little in offspring following birth. However, like other viperids, female tiger rattlesnakes invest in provisioning resources for developing embryos. She eats early in the pregnancy and then finds a safe place to hide while providing the optimal thermal environment for development.

== Development ==
Tiger rattlesnake embryos are retained inside the female in a transparent, membranous sac, where some materials and gases are exchanged between embryo and mother. Embryos receive fluids and sustenance from the yolk mass. Once born, neonates break through the embryonic sac and travel a short distance to a safe nook with its siblings. Young tiger rattlesnakes are not born with a rattle. Neonates have a skin cap at the tip of the tail, and after every molt, a new rattle segment is added. Like all rattlesnakes, tiger rattlesnakes are ovoviviparous and thus, are well developed at birth.

== Conservation status ==
This species is classified as "Least Concern" on the IUCN Red List of Threatened Species. Species are listed as such due to their wide distribution, presumed large population, or because they are unlikely to be declining fast enough to qualify for listing in a more threatened category. The population trend was stable when assessed in 2007.

=== Population ===
The population trend of the tiger rattlesnake is considered to be stable. On a range-wide scale, Campbell and Lamar (2004) mapped 33 collection sites. Lowe et al. (1986) stated the species is known from around 100 localities throughout the range. The adult population size is unknown, but presumably exceeds 10,000. This snake is fairly common in some areas, but "some local populations seem small". Its extent of occurrence, area of occupancy, number of subpopulations, and population size are probably relatively stable or declining at a rate of less than 10% over 10 years or three generations.

=== Threats ===
Southern populations on the flatter areas of the coastal plain of Sonora are probably losing habitat due to the intensification of agriculture. Overall, however, this species is not seriously threatened.

== Relevance ==
=== Negative ===
Their venom contains a neurotoxin and a myotoxin known to cause muscle necrosis. Although production is low compared to other rattlesnakes, their venom is the third most toxic of any snake in the Western Hemisphere. The combination of toxins in their venom makes them dangerous to humans.

=== Positive ===
Rattlesnake venom is often used in biomedical research investigating neurological diseases. Additionally, tiger rattlesnakes prey upon a number of rodent species considered pests by humans throughout their geographic range. Tiger rattlesnakes feed on a number of small vertebrate species and likely help regulate their abundance and distribution. No information reports parasites specific to this species.

== Venom ==
Although it has a comparatively low venom yield, its toxicity is considered to be the second highest of all rattlesnake venoms (next to the mojave), and the second highest of all snakes in the Western Hemisphere. It has a high neurotoxic fraction that is antigenically related to Mojave toxin (see Crotalus scutulatus, venom A), and includes another component immunologically identical to crotamine, which is a myotoxin also found in tropical rattlesnakes (see Crotalus durissus). A low but significant protease activity is in the venom, although it does not seem to have any hemolytic activity.

Brown (1973) lists an average venom yield of 11 mg (dried venom) and an LD_{50} value of 0.6 mg/kg IP for toxicity. Other studies give LD_{50} values of 0.07 mg/kg IP, 0.056 mg/kg IV, and 0.21 mg/kg SC. Minton and Weinstein (1984) list an average venom yield of 6.4 mg (based on two specimens). Weinstein and Smith (1990) list a venom yield of 10 mg.

There is very little information available for bite symptoms. Human bites by the tiger rattlesnake are infrequent, and literature available on bites by this snake is scarce. The several recorded human envenomations by tiger rattlesnakes produced little local pain, swelling, or other reaction following the bite, and despite the toxicity of its venom no significant systemic symptoms. The comparatively low venom yield (6.4–11 mg dried venom) and short 4.0 mm (0.40 cm) to 4.6 mm (0.46 cm) fangs of the tiger rattlesnake possibly prevent severe envenoming in adult humans. However, the clinical picture could be much more serious if the person bitten was a child or a slight build individual. The early therapeutic use of antivenom is important if significant envenomation is suspected. Despite the low venom yield, a bite by this rattlesnake should be considered a life-threatening medical emergency. Untreated mortality rate is unknown but this snake has a very high venom toxicity and its bites are capable of producing major envenomation.
