= Rattlesnake round-up =

Captured wild rattlesnake fair

"Miss Snake Charmer", Hannah Smith, and a cowboy snake-handler Terry "Hollywood" Armstrong, hoist a hefty specimen at the 2014 "World's Largest Rattlesnake Roundup" in Sweetwater, Texas.

Rattlesnake round-ups (or roundups), also known as rattlesnake rodeos, are annual events common in the rural Midwest and Southern United States, where the primary attractions are captured wild rattlesnakes which are sold, displayed, killed for food or animal products (such as snakeskin) or released back into the wild. Rattlesnake round-ups originated in the first half of the 20th century for adventure and excitement, as well as to achieve local extirpation of perceived pest species. Typically a round-up will also include trade stalls, food, rides, and other features associated with fairs, as well as snake shows that provide information on rattlesnake biology, identification, and safety. To date, round-ups where snakes are killed take place in Alabama, Georgia, Oklahoma, and Texas, with largest events in Texas and Oklahoma. Many round-ups are no longer slaughtering snakes, but have transitioned to educational festivals celebrating rattlesnakes and other wildlife. All round-ups in Pennsylvania return snakes to the wild and two former round-ups in Georgia and Florida use captive animals for their festivals. The largest rattlesnake round-up in the United States is held in Sweetwater, Texas. Held annually in mid-March since 1958, the event currently attracts approximately 30,000 visitors per year and in 2006 each annual round-up was said to result in the capture of 1% of the state's rattlesnake population, but there are no data or studies to support this claim.

Round-ups have economic and social importance to the communities that hold them. The events often attract thousands of tourists, which can bring hundreds of thousands of dollars of revenue into small towns; the Sweetwater Round-Up's economic impact was estimated to exceed US$5 million in 2006. Snake collectors often make large profits selling snakes at the events.

Cash prizes and trophies are often given out to participants in categories like heaviest, longest, or most snakes. These incentives result in all size classes of snakes being targeted equally. Most roundups target the western diamondback rattlesnake (Crotalus atrox), though some events target prairie rattlesnakes (C. viridis), timber rattlesnakes (C. horridus), or the eastern diamondback rattlesnake (C. adamanteus).

A harvest of several hundred to several thousand kilograms of snakes is typical for many roundups. In Texas, up to 125,000 snakes could have been removed annually from the wild during the 1990s. However, effects of roundups on rattlesnake populations are unclear. Harvest size at roundups is highly variable from year to year but does not show a consistent downward trend, even after decades of annual roundup events in some areas. C. atrox is listed as Least Concern by the IUCN. However, poaching and roundups have been destructive to populations of timber rattlesnakes (C. horridus) in the northeastern United States. Some groups are concerned that local C. atrox populations may be declining rapidly, even if the global population is unaffected. Rattlesnake round-ups became a concern by animal welfare groups and conservationists due to claims of animal cruelty and excessive threat of future endangerment. In response, some round-ups impose catch size restrictions or release captured snakes back into the wild.
