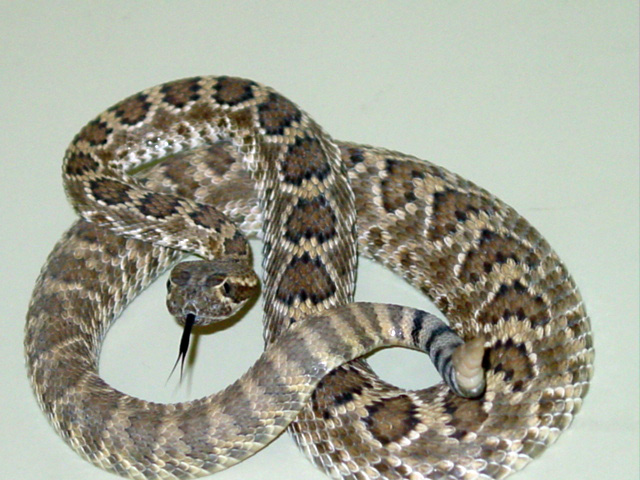

Conservation status
- Least Concern (IUCN 3.1)

Scientific classification
- Kingdom: Animalia
- Phylum: Chordata
- Class: Reptilia
- Order: Squamata
- Suborder: Serpentes
- Family: Viperidae
- Genus: Crotalus
- Species: C. scutulatus

Binomial name
- Crotalus scutulatus (Kennicott, 1861)

Synonyms
- Caudisona scutulata Kennicott, 1861; C[rotalus]. scutulatus — Cope In Yarrow in Wheeler, 1875; Crotalus adamanteus scutulatus — Cope, 1875; Crotalus scutulatus — Boulenger, 1896; Crotalus confluentus kellyi Amaral, 1929; Crotalus scutulatus scutulatus — Gloyd, 1940

= Crotalus scutulatus =

Species of snake

Crotalus scutulatus is species of rattlesnake, a venomous pit viper in the family Viperidae.

The species is known commonly as the Mohave Rattlesnake. Other common English names include Mojave Rattlesnake and, referring specifically to the nominate (northern) subspecies: Northern Mohave Rattlesnake and Mojave Green Rattlesnake, the latter name commonly shortened to the more colloquial "Mojave green". Campbell and Lamar (2004) supported the English name "Mohave (Mojave) rattlesnake" with some reluctance because so little of the snake's range lies within the Mojave Desert. The spelling of the English name with an "h" has been advocated by multiple authors in recent years for various reasons. The most recent iteration of standard English names for North American reptiles, endorsed by the major herpetological societies in the United States and Canada, concludes that spelling with either a "j" or an "h" is correct, based on "whether the word is used in a Spanish or English context." Thus, their standard English names list adopted the "h" spelling.

Crotalus scutulatus is a highly venomous pitviper (family Viperidae, subfamily Crotalinae) found in the deserts of the southwestern United States and deep into mainland Mexico. It is perhaps best known for producing two distinctly different venom types in different populations.

Two subspecies are currently recognized. This account describes the widely distributed nominate subspecies, the Northern Mohave Rattlesnake, Crotalus scutulatus scutulatus. The other subspecies, C. scutulatus salvini, occurs in a relatively small area deep in mainland Mexico.

== Type specimen and type locality ==
The type specimen (holotype) of Crotalus scutulatus is ANSP 7069, in the collection of the Philadelphia Academy of Natural Sciences (formerly one of two specimens of USNM 5027 at the Smithsonian Institution). The type locality is "Fort Buchanan, Arizona". The ruins of Fort Buchanan are in present day Santa Cruz County, Arizona.

== Description ==
Crotalus scutulatus grows to an average total length (tail included) of less than 100 cm (3.3 ft), with a maximum total length of 123.6 cm (4.1 ft) for males and 92.2 cm (3.0 ft) for females.

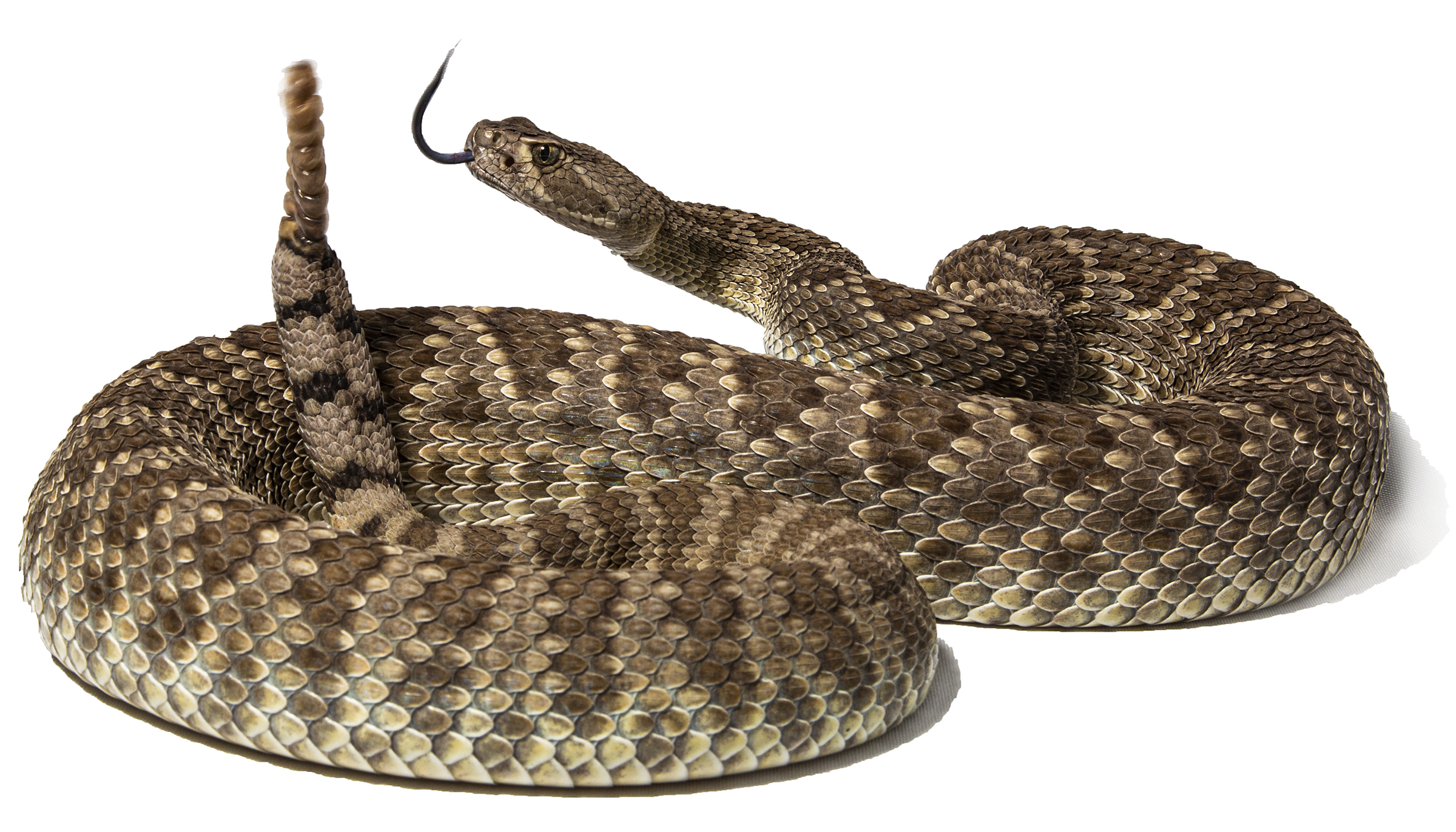
Typical adult Mohave rattlesnake

There is no single visual trait that reliably identifies C. scutulatus and the most reliable visual identifications result from careful consideration of multiple traits. C. scutulatus is broadly sympatric with C. atrox (the Western Diamond-backed Rattlesnake), which it closely resembles. The dorsal color of C. scutulatus varies from shades of green to browns, grays, and even yellowish. C. scutulatus has a row of large diamond-shaped dorsal blotches closely resembling C. atrox but lacking the abundant dark speckling, both coarse and fine, found throughout the dorsal surfaces of C. atrox. Additionally, C. scutulatus lacks the white margins along the caudal edges of the dorsal "diamonds" that are found in most C. atrox. The postocular light facial stripe usually bends toward the neck and does not intersect with the mouth in C. scutulatus, as it does in C. atrox. The tail is usually marked with alternating pale and dark rings in both species, with the dark rings often (but not always) being narrower than the pale ones in C. scutulatus and the colors are usually less distinct than the bright white and dark black caudal rings of most C. atrox. The proximal rattle segment contains live tissue and is usually bicolor – yellow and black, or entirely yellow, in C. scutulatus, but entirely black (sometimes with a brush of white) in C. atrox.

The crown scales (between the supraoculars) of C. scutulatus are relatively large compared to other rattlesnakes like C. atrox (but see C. molossus and C. ornatus), and the enlarged scales spill out behind the supraocular scales in a fan shape, usually with a well-defined margin. The minimum number of scales separating the supraoculars varies from two to four in C. scutulatus. Crown scales on C. atrox are usually smaller, more numerous, and they do not produce the well-defined fan where they integrate into the scales behind the crown.

Comparison of the most significant distinguishing traits between C. scutulatus and other commonly-encountered sympatric rattlesnakes. Adapted from Cardwell et al. 2022
Trait	Crotalus scutulatus	Crotalus atrox	Crotalus molossus*	Crotalus viridis
Greenish color	Sometimes	No	Sometimes	Often
Pattern speckling	Little or none	Obvious, course and fine	Little or none	Little or none
Tail color & caudal rings	Dark gray, black, or brown rings on pale gray or white background	High-contrast black rings on white background	Tail uniformly black, gray, or dark brown, with occasional faint pale rings	Narrow dark and pale rings, same colors as dorsum, with little or no whitish color
Proximal rattle segment	Yellow or bicolor (yellow and black)	Black with occasional brush of white	Black	Black
Pale postocular stripe	Passes above the mouth	Intersects with mouth	Absent	Passes above the mouth
Crown scales	Large and irregular, spilling out onto parietal area	Small and granular, indistinct from parietal area	Large and square anteriorly, others small and uniform	Small and granular, indistinct from parietal area
* Same traits as C. ornatus

== Geographic range ==
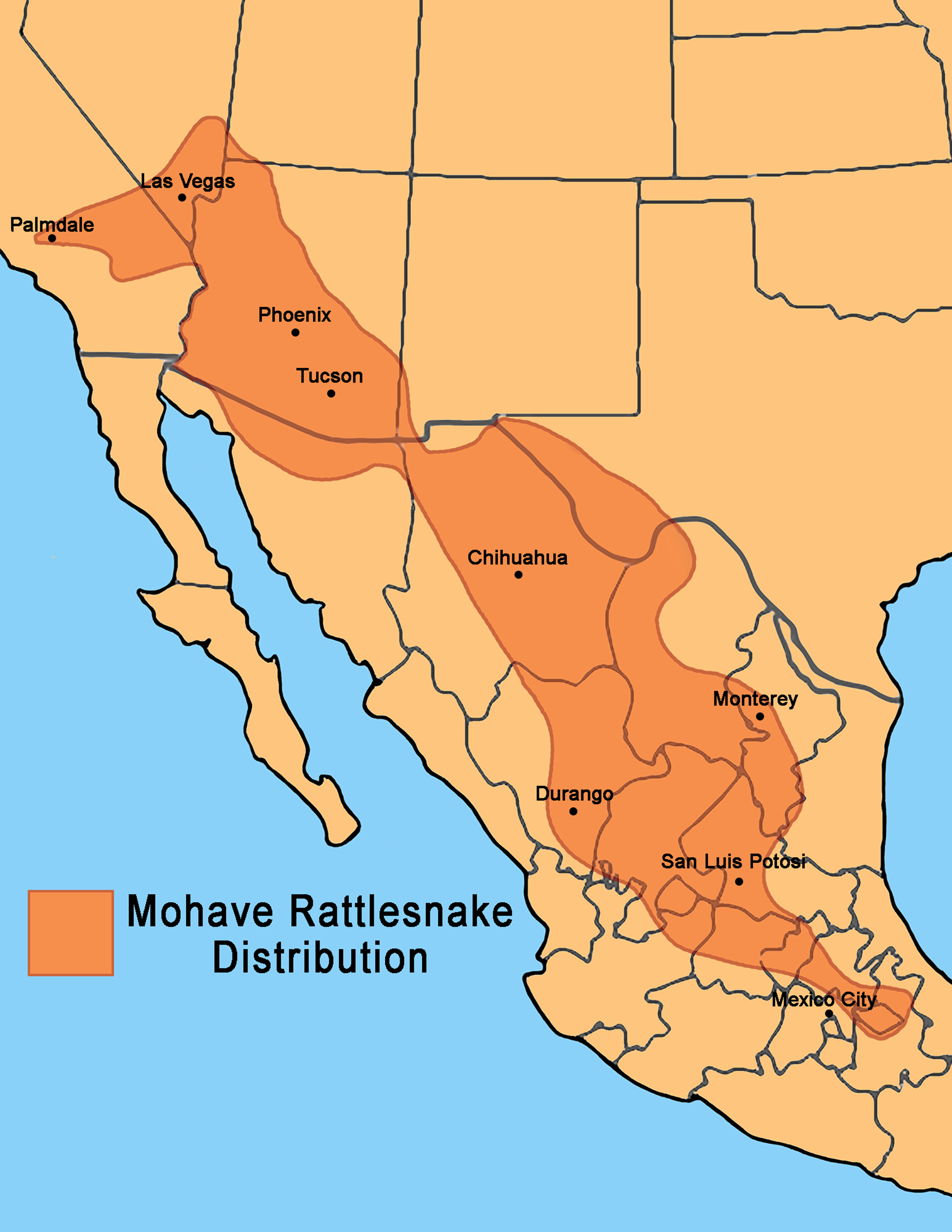

Crotalus scutulatus is found in arid habitats in the southwestern United States, from the Mohave Desert in California's Los Angeles and San Bernardino Counties, across most of western and southern Arizona (southwest of the Mogollon Rim), and from El Paso County south through the Big Bend region of western Texas. It also occurs as far north as Lincoln County in Nevada, the southwest corner of Washington County in Utah, and portions of extreme southern New Mexico. In Mexico, it is found in Sonora, Chihuahua, and south on the Mexican Plateau to the states of Mexico, Puebla, and Veracruz. It is found in deserts and other areas with xeric vegetation from near sea level to about 2,500 m (8,200 ft) elevation.

== Habitat ==
Crotalus scutulatus is primarily an inhabitant of broad desert valleys or lower mountain slopes, C. scutulatus is often found in sparsely vegetated areas containing predominantly creosote (Larrea), sage (Ambrosia), mesquite (Prosopis), various cacti (Cactaceae), and Joshua trees (Yucca brevifolia), as well as juniper (Juniperus) woodland and grassland (Poaceae) habitats in some places. In general, C. scutulatus tends to avoid densely vegetated and extremely rocky areas, preferring relatively flat, open, and xeric habitats.

== Conservation status ==
Crotalus scutulatus is classified as Least Concern (LC) on the IUCN Red List of Threatened Species (v 3.1, 2001). Species are listed as such due to their wide distribution, presumed large population, or because they are unlikely to be declining fast enough to qualify for listing in a more threatened category. The population trend was stable when assessed in 2007.

== Behavior ==
A C. scutulatus attacking a kangaroo rat

Crotalus scutulatus is most active from April to September. They are ambush predators, eating mostly small rodents and lizards. Courtship begins in late summer/fall, is interrupted by winter, and resumes in the spring. Females bear live young, from two to 17 (average about eight), from July through September.

This species is not known to den communally and they have no need to seasonally migrate between winter dens and summer foraging areas, as do some other species living at higher elevations and higher latitudes. Instead, individuals occupy well defined home ranges year around, taking shelter during the winter and hot summer weather in burrows excavated by animals like rodents, tortoises, and kit foxes.

Like other rattlesnakes, this species is routinely preyed upon by larger predators like coyotes, bobcats, and raptors. As a result, it is shy, cryptic, and does not seek out confrontations with larger creatures, including humans. But like other rattlesnake species, it will strike and bite vigorously when disturbed, especially if surprised or when there is no nearby vegetation or burrow into which the snake can escape.

== Recent genetic and morphological analyses ==
Robust genetic analyses have revealed the population structure of Crotalus scutulatus throughout the species' range, correlating genetic evidence of isolation and subsequent secondary contact of subpopulations with corresponding geologic and climatic events. As a result, four genetically distinct clades among present-day C. scutulatus have been described.

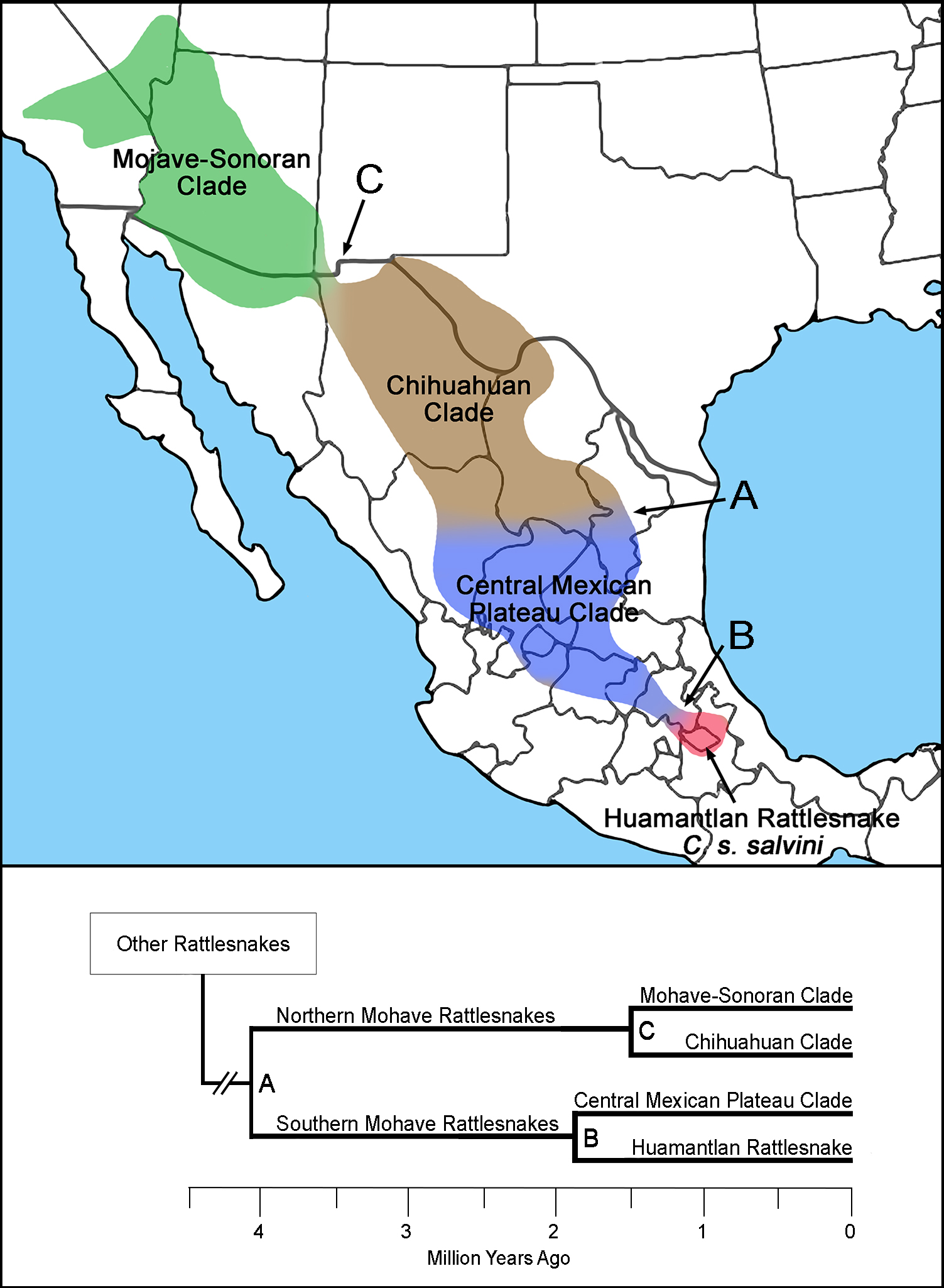
Phylogenetic map and tree of Crotalus scutulatus. Divergence of Northern Clade from the Southern Clade (A), the Huamantlan rattlesnake from the Central Mexican Plateau Clade (B), and the Mojave-Sonoran Clade from the Chihuahuan Clade (C). Adapted from Cardwell 2020 (map), and Schield et al. 2018 (tree).

The earliest split occurred at the northern margin of the Central Mexican Plateau about 4.1 million years ago (MYA), separating the species into northern and southern subpopulations. Then about 1.8 MYA, the subpopulation now identified as C. scutulatus salvini diverged genetically from the animals on the Central Mexican Plateau. Most recently, the northern subpopulation was divided at the Continental Divide (Cochise Filter) about 1.5 MYA, creating the Mojave-Sonoran clade to the west and the Chihuahuan clade to the southeast. Note that the boundaries between these clades correspond to elevational clines where climatic shifts during Pleistocene glacial advances and retreats likely isolated the subpopulations during cold periods but allowed secondary contact and resumption of gene flow during warmer periods, including the present.

These analyses indicate that the Central Mexican Plateau clade is more closely related (i.e., more recently shared a common ancestor) to the Huamantlan Rattlesnake (currently C. scutulatus salvini) than it is to the northern (Mojave-Sonoran and Chihuahuan) clades, suggesting that the designation of salvini as a subspecies of all other C. scutulatus is problematic.

More recently, qualitative, meristic, and morphometric traits from 347 specimens of C. scutulatus were analyzed, producing the conclusion that the species "is phenotypically cohesive without discrete subgroups, and that morphology follows a continuous cline in primary color pattern and meristic traits across the major axis of its expansive distribution," suggesting that "multiple episodes of isolation and secondary contact among metapopulations during the Pleistocene were sufficient to produce distinctive genetic populations, which have since experienced gene flow to produce clinal variation in phenotypes without discrete or diagnosable distinctions among these original populations." It was recommended that, for taxonomic purposes, Crotalus scutulatus "be retained as a single species, although it is possible that C. s. salvini, which is morphologically the most distinctive population, could represent a peripheral isolate in the initial stages of speciation."

== Venom ==
=== History ===
For decades, the bite of Crotalus scutulatus has been considered to be extraordinarily deadly, often described as "the" (or "one of the") deadliest or most dangerous rattlesnakes. For example: "the most lethal of the North American rattlesnake venoms"; "one of the most lethal venoms among the world's reptiles"; "an extremely dangerous snake"; "probably the most dangerous snake in the United States"; and "considered among the most venomous snakes on Earth".

Such claims are usually attributed to the neurotoxin produced by most populations of C. scutulatus in the United States and Mexico, which has been reported to be capable of causing delayed respiratory paralysis with little or no local tissue injury. This neurotoxin was isolated and described in 1975 and named "Mojave toxin". In 1978, an area in southcentral Arizona was identified where the venom of C. scutulatus is significantly less lethal to laboratory mice than venom from the balance of the species' range. The more lethal (and more widely distributed) variant was named "venom A" and the less lethal variant was named "venom B". The difference in lethality was later determined to be lack of Mojave toxin in the venom B population. Thus, venom A became known as the neurotoxic variant and venom B became the non-neurotoxic variant. In addition to the absence of Mojave toxin, C. scutulatus venom B was found to contain tissue-destroying toxins, predominantly metalloproteinases, similar to the venoms of many other rattlesnakes. Some animals in the intergrade zone between venom A and B populations produce venom containing both Mojave toxin and significant metalloproteinase and they have been labeled "venom A+B".

Other studies have noted that pitviper venoms can be divided generally into two dichotomous groups that have been termed "toxicity vs. tenderizers" (neurotoxic vs. tissue-destroying, respectively). The more toxic (lethal to lab mice) venoms are dominated by presynaptic neurotoxins (of which Mojave toxin is one homolog) but they lack significant amounts of hemorrhagic and tissue-destroying metalloproteinases and serine proteinases, while the "tenderizer" venoms are dominated by the hemorrhagic and tissue-destroying components but contain little or no neurotoxin. In the broader context of all pitvipers, the more common venoms containing higher levels of metalloproteinase and lacking significant neurotoxin have been termed "type I" venoms, while venoms containing high levels of neurotoxin but lacking hemorrhagic and tissue-destroying components are called "type II". Thus, C. scutulatus venom A is a type II venom, and venom B is a type I venom.

=== Mojave toxin ===
Mojave toxin is a potent presynaptic β-neurotoxin composed of two distinct peptide subunits. The basic phospholipase A_{2} (PLA_{2}) subunit alone is mildly toxic while the acidic subunit is not toxic by itself, but both subunits must be present to constitute Mojave toxin. The basic subunit is present in the venoms of many species of Crotalus, including adamanteus, pyrrhus, scutulatus, tigris, and viridis. The acidic subunit is less commonly distributed and limited to individuals in populations that also express the basic subunit.

== Human lethality ==
=== Mortality ===
Mortality statistics have long shown that there are only about two to six people killed by venomous snakes annually in the United States, with most deaths reported in the southeastern states, despite Crotalus scutulatus occurring only in the southwest, where it is commonly encountered and responsible for many bites each year. Thus, statistics from both the Centers for Disease Control and the American Association of Poison Control Centers suggest that bites by C. scutulatus are no more lethal than bites by other rattlesnake species.

=== Respiratory paralysis ===
Respiratory paralysis was reported in laboratory animals in the 1930s during comparison of venoms from North American pitvipers, confirming respiratory paralysis and indicating extreme lethality (aka toxicity) in pigeons caused by C. scutulatus venom. Numerous subsequent studies, mostly using mice, confirmed the relative lethality of C. scutulatus venom A in laboratory animals. In 1956, Laurence Klauber quoted these studies in his widely-read rattlesnake reference, adding "…if future tests of the quality of the venom of C. s. scutulatus corroborate the m.l.d. [median lethal dose] figures now available, this may prove to be a very dangerous rattler." Apparently because of these early animal studies, warnings subsequently abounded about the extreme lethality and danger of respiratory paralysis following bites by C. scutulatus.

=== Recent clinical studies ===
Recent investigations of human rattlesnake bites in regions where C. scutulatus is common have cast doubt on the legitimacy of concerns regarding extreme lethality and respiratory failure/paralysis in humans. A retrospective study of 3440 Arizona rattlesnake bites reported to the Arizona Poison and Drug Information Center (covering all of Arizona except Maricopa County) between January 1999 and December 2020, disclosed no reports of neurotoxic respiratory failure/paralysis. Another retrospective study of 289 rattlesnake bites treated at a tertiary referral hospital in Maricopa County between July 1994 and November 2000, also found no reports of neurotoxic respiratory failure/paralysis.

These published findings are consistent with anecdotal reports from southern California, where C. scutulatus is the predominant biting rattlesnake in the flat creosote bush scrub of the Mohave Desert, where all animals tested thus far have expressed neurotoxic (type II/venom-A) venom, and where sympatric C. atrox is not present to confuse snake identification. A literature search for published case reports (that was not limited in scope, either geographically or temporally) revealed only one case of neurotoxic respiratory failure.

While the physiological effects of Mojave toxin are almost certainly dose-dependent, many other variables affect how an organism (pigeon, lab mouse, squirrel, human, etc.) is affected, including such factors as the organism's body mass, age, health, comorbidities, allergies, genetic profile, and many others.

=== Prognosis of bite victims ===
While C. scutulatus is capable of inflicting a life-threatening bite, the prognosis of C. scutulatus bite victims appears to be no worse than that of victims bitten by other rattlesnakes of similar size. Factors that worsen the prognosis of pitviper bites include delay in reaching advanced medical care, small victim size, and large snake size.

=== Antivenoms ===
Both antivenoms available in the United States are licensed by the US Food and Drug Administration for the treatment of bites by all native pitvipers, including envenomations by C. scutulatus. Each product contains antibodies raised against the venoms of multiple carefully selected pitviper species. Neurotoxic C. scutulatus venom is used in the manufacture of CroFab^{®}, while the venom of a tropical rattlesnake (C. simus) that expresses a very similar neurotoxin, is used in the production of Anavip^{®}. Thus, both products are designed to be effective against neurotoxic C. scutulatus envenomations, and venoms from other species used in the production of both products are protective against type I/venom-B (non-neurotoxic) C. scutulatus bites.

== Subspecies ==
Subspecies	Taxon author	Common name	Geographic range
C. scutulatus salvini	Günther, 1895	Huamantlan rattlesnake	Mexico, from Hidalgo through Tlaxcala and Puebla to southwestern Veracruz
C. scutulatus scutulatus	(Kennicott, 1861)	Northern Mojave rattlesnake	The United States from California eastward to west Texas and southward to Querétaro in Mexico

The subspecific name, salvini, is in honor of English herpetologist Osbert Salvin.
