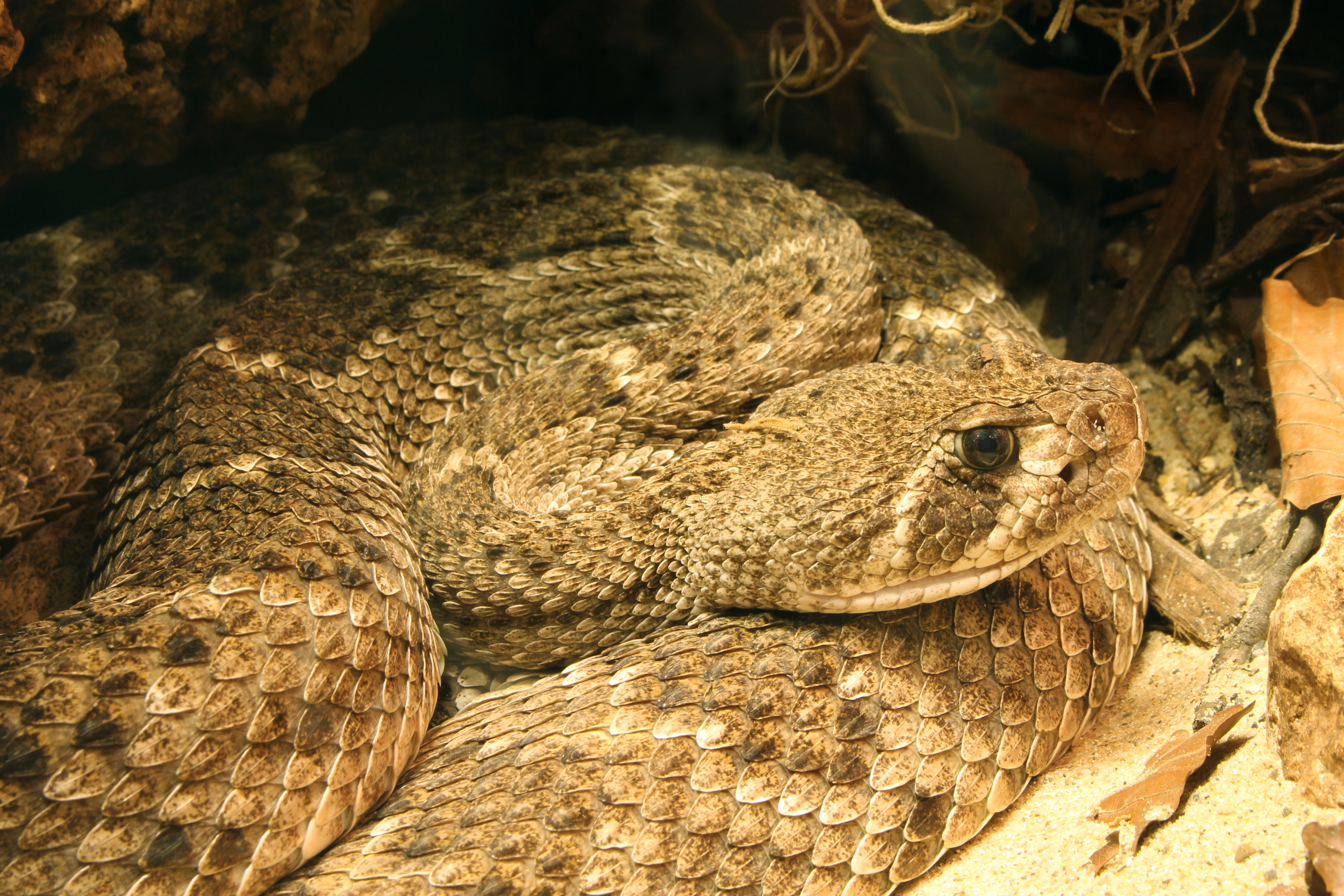

Conservation status
- Least Concern (IUCN 3.1)

Scientific classification
- Kingdom: Animalia
- Phylum: Chordata
- Class: Reptilia
- Order: Squamata
- Suborder: Serpentes
- Family: Viperidae
- Genus: Crotalus
- Species: C. atrox

Binomial name
- Crotalus atrox Baird & Girard, 1853
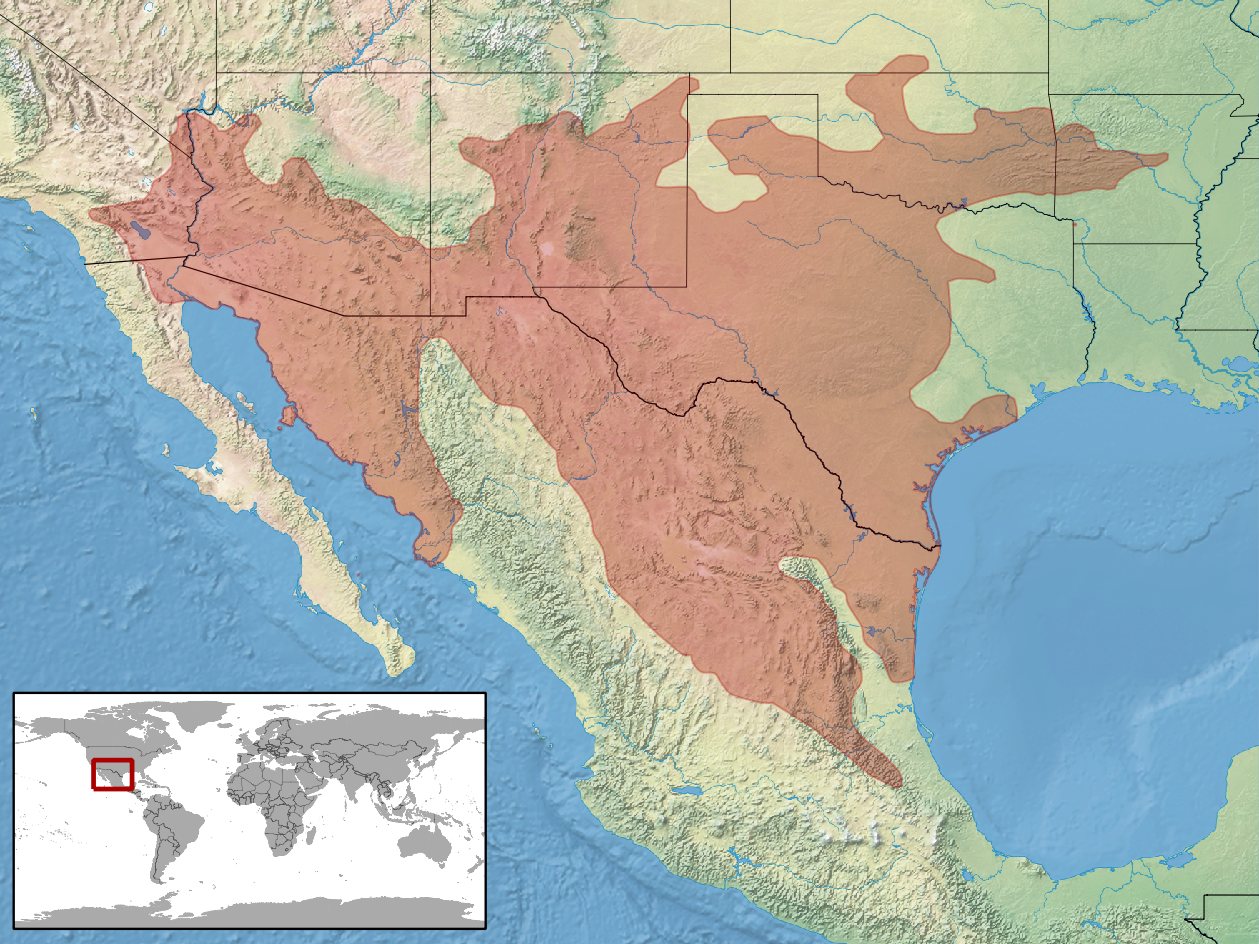

Synonyms
- List: Crotalus cinereous Le Conte in Hallowell, 1852 [nomen oblitum]; Crotalus atrox Baird & Girard, 1853 [nomen protectum]; Crotalus adamanteus var. atrox Jan, 1859; Caudisona atrox var. atrox Kennicott, 1861; Caudisona atrox var. sonoraensis Kennicott, 1861; C[rotalus]. adamanteus var. atrox Jan, 1863; C[rotalus]. atrox var. sonoriensis Jan, 1863; C[audisona]. atrox Cope, 1867; Crotalus adamanteus atrox Cope in Yarrow in Wheeler, 1875; Caudisona atrox var. sonorensis Boulenger, 1896; Crotalus atrox atrox Cope, 1900; [Crotalus] atrox sonoraensis Amaral, 1929; Crotalus atrox Klauber, 1972; Crotalus sonoriensis Golay et al., 1993; Crotalus atrox Golay et al., 1993

= Western diamondback rattlesnake =

Species of snake

The western diamondback rattlesnake (Crotalus atrox) or western diamond-backed rattlesnake, is a rattlesnake species and member of the viper family, found in the southwestern United States and Mexico. Like all other rattlesnakes and all other vipers, it is venomous. It is likely responsible for the majority of snakebite fatalities in northern Mexico and the greatest number of snakebites in the U.S. No subspecies are currently recognized.

It lives in elevations from below sea level up to 6,500 feet (2,000 m). This species ranges throughout the Southwestern United States and northern half of Mexico. Currently, western diamondback rattlesnakes are not threatened or endangered.

== Common names ==
Other common names for this species include western diamond-backed rattlesnake, adobe snake, Arizona diamond rattlesnake, coon tail, desert diamond-back, desert diamond rattlesnake, sand tail, fierce rattlesnake, spitting rattlesnake, buzz tail, Texan rattlesnake, Texas diamond-back, Texas bark and Texas rattler.

== Description ==
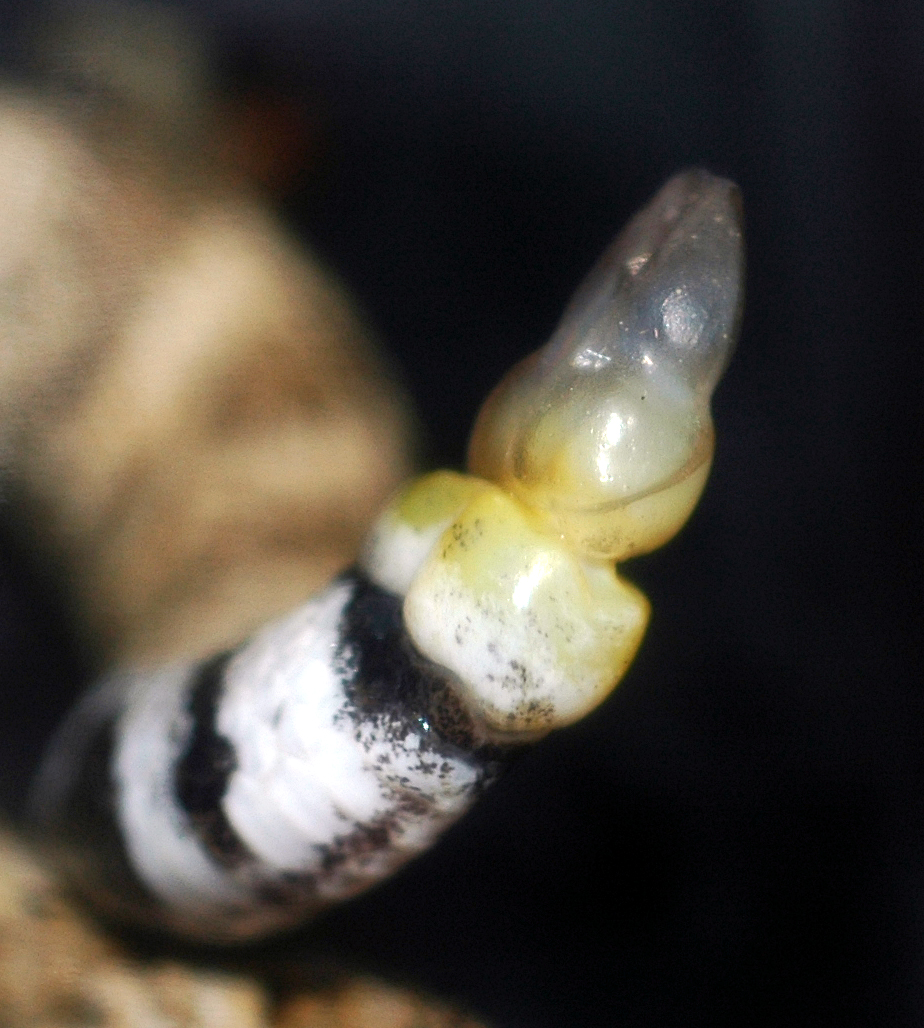
The button rattle of a juvenile

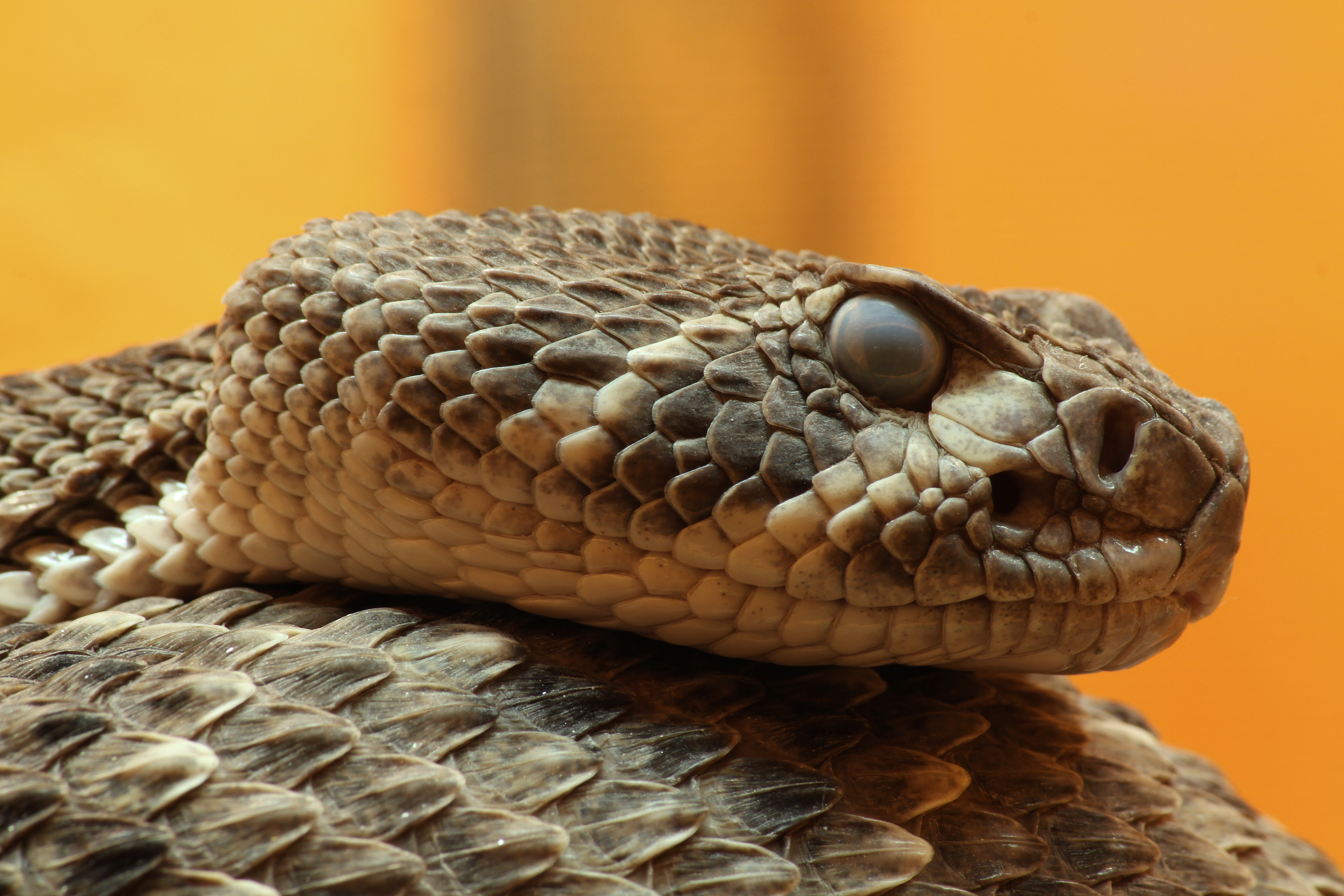
Closeup of the head at the Zoological Garden, Ulm, Germany

Adults commonly grow to 120 cm (4 ft) in length. Specimens over 150 cm (5 ft) are infrequently encountered, while those over 180 cm (6 ft) are very rare, and the largest reported length considered to be reliable is 213 cm (7 ft). Males become much larger than females, although this difference in size does not occur until after they have reached sexual maturity. Rattlesnakes of this species considered medium-sized weigh up to 1.23 to 2.7 kg (3 to 6 lb), while very large specimens can reportedly weigh up to 6.7 kg (15 lb). Overall, it is likely the second largest-bodied species of rattlesnake, behind only its close cousin the eastern diamondback rattlesnake. It is also the second largest of North American venomous snakes (the bushmasters, which attain similar weights and greater total length, occur up as far as Nicaragua).

The color pattern generally consists of a khaki ground color, but it may also be pinkish or fallow, brick red, yellowish blonde, or white. This ground color is overlaid dorsally with a series of 23-45 (mean, 36) dorsal body blotches that are brown or a darker umber. The first of these may be a pair of short stripes that extend backwards to eventually merge. Some of the first few blotches on the back may be somewhat rectangular, but then become more hexagonal and eventually take on the distinctive diamond shape. The clarity of these markings is often blurred by small specks. The tail has two to eight (usually four to six) black bands separated by white or gray interspaces; this led to the nickname of "coontail", though other species (e.g., Mojave rattlesnake) have similarly banded tails. Its postocular stripe is gray or umber and extends diagonally from the lower edge of the eye across the side of the head. This stripe is usually bordered below by a white stripe running from the upper preocular scale down to the supralabial scales just below and behind the eye.

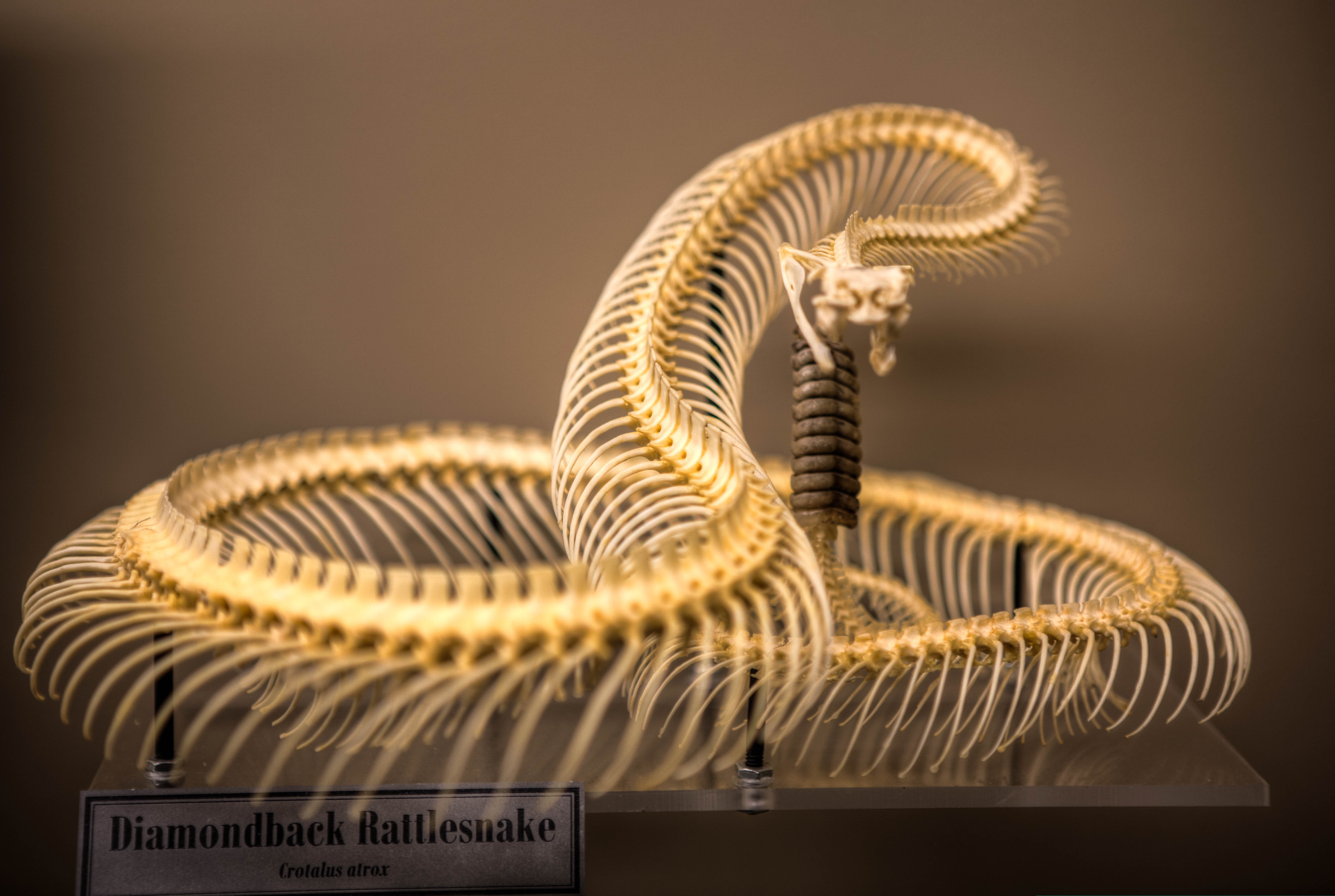
A skeleton at the Museum of Osteology, Oklahoma City, Oklahoma

The wide range of this species overlaps, or is close to, that of many others. It may be confused with them, but differences exist. The Mojave rattlesnake (C. scutulatus), also has tail rings, but the black rings are narrow relative to the pale ones. The timber rattlesnake (C. horridus), has no tail rings. In the western rattlesnake (C. oreganus), the pale tail rings are the same color as the ground. The tail of the black-tailed rattlesnake (C. molossus), is a uniform black, or has indistinct tail rings. The Mexican west coast rattlesnake (C. basiliscus), also has a mostly dark tail with obscure or absent rings. The tiger rattlesnake, (C. tigris), has a relatively small head and large rattle along with a dorsal pattern consisting more of crossbands. The Middle American rattlesnake (C. simus), has a generally uniform gray tail without any rings, as well as a pair of distinctive paravertebral stripes running down the neck. Members of the genus Sistrurus lack tail rings and have enlarged head plates.

== Distribution ==
=== Geographic range ===
It is found in the United States from central Arkansas to southeastern and Central California, south into Mexico as far as northern Sinaloa, Hidalgo and northern Veracruz. Disjunct populations exist in southern Veracruz and southeastern Oaxaca. The type locality given is "Indianola" (Indianola, Calhoun County, Texas). Rattlesnakes such as the Western Diamondback are common in Texas coastal beaches such as Surfside Beach, Brazoria County, Texas.

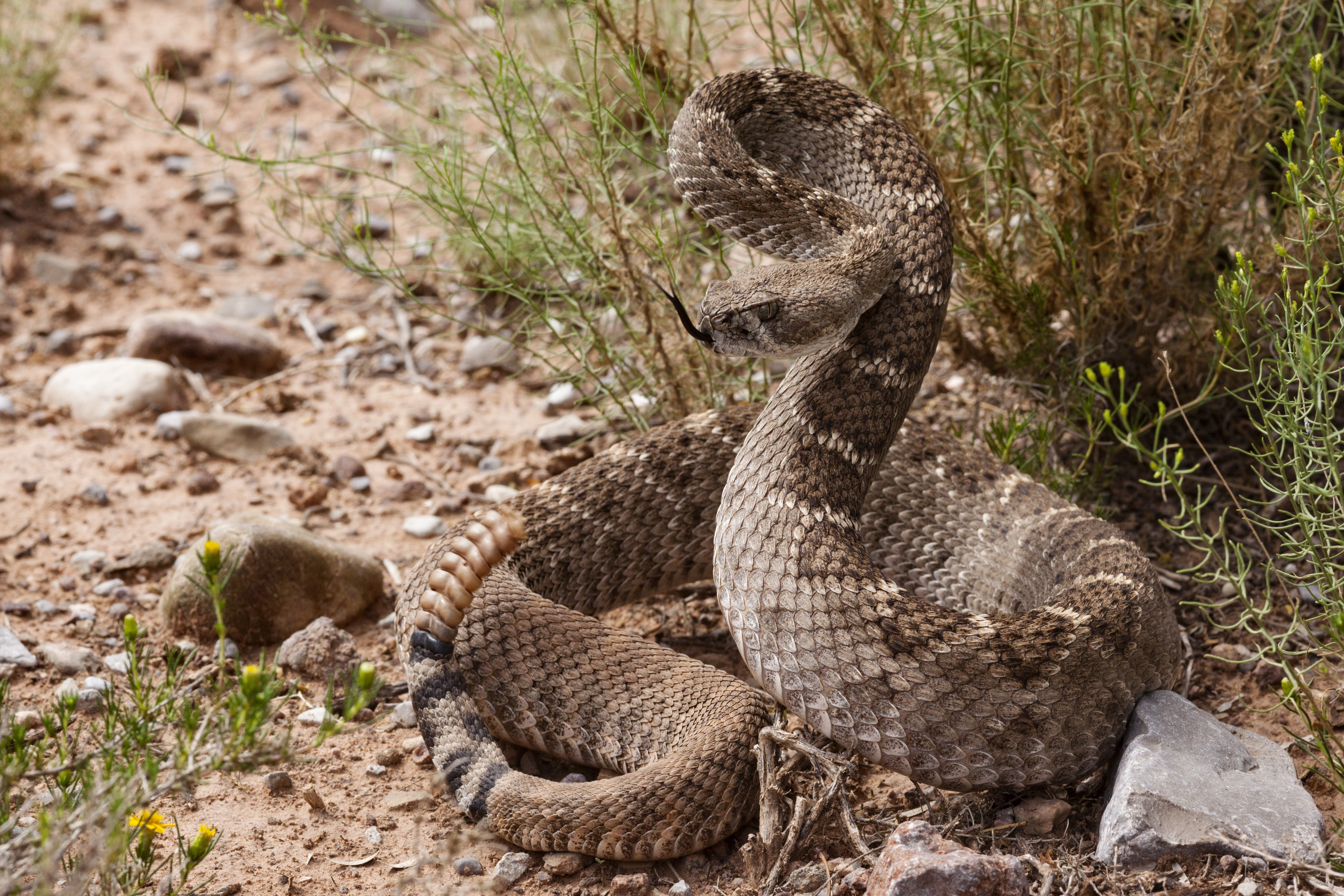
In New Mexico

In the United States, it occurs in central and western Arkansas, Oklahoma excluding the northeast, north-central region and the panhandle, Texas excluding the northern panhandle and the east, southern and central New Mexico and Arizona, extreme southern Nevada, and in southeastern California on either side of the Chocolate Mountains. Records from extreme southern Kansas (Cowley and Sumner Counties) may be based on a natural occurrence of the species, while multiple records from near Kanopolis Reservoir in Ellsworth County seem to indicate a viable (although isolated) population.

In Mexico, it occurs in Nuevo León, Coahuila, Chihuahua, Sonora, extreme northeastern Baja California, northern Sinaloa, northeastern Durango, Zacatecas, most of San Luis Potosí, northern Veracruz, Hidalgo, and Querétaro. Specimens have been collected in the mountains northwest of Tehuantepec, Oaxaca, on numerous occasions, but had not been reported there since the 1940s until 2023, when its presence was confirmed after 79 years of no sightings.

This species has also been reported on a number of islands in the Gulf of California, including San Pedro Mártir, Santa María (Sinaloa), Tíburon and the Turner Islands. The Tortuga Island diamond rattlesnake is also a subspecies.

=== Habitat ===
Its habitats range from flat coastal plains to steep rocky canyons and hillsides; it is associated with many different vegetation types, including desert, sandy creosote areas, mesquite grassland, desert scrub, and pine-oak forests. Frequently roaming during the day, it is common to see the western diamondback when ambient temperatures drop because of the heat retention of blacktop roads.

== Behavior ==
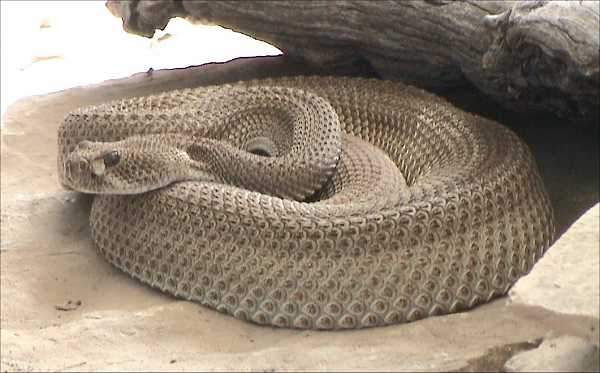
C. atrox, patternless specimen

C. atrox is solitary except during the mating season, when males of the species are single-minded and aggressive in pursuing females. Usually inactive between late October and early March, these ectotherms occasionally may be seen basking in the sun on warm winter days. In the winter, they hibernate or brumate in caves or burrows, sometimes with many other species of snakes. Active, alert, and large (most adults are between four and a half and five feet long), the western diamondback can administer a large amount of venom in its bite; it is not inclined to give ground when confronted.

They are poor climbers. Natural predators include raptors such as hawks and eagles, roadrunners, wild hogs, and other snakes. When threatened, they usually coil and rattle to warn aggressors. They are one of the more defensive rattlesnake species in the US in the way that they stand their ground when confronted by a foe. If rattling does not work, then the snake will strike in defense.

Among rattlesnakes, C. atrox may be the most adaptable to semi-urban transitional habitat. In developing areas where they are common, such as the Phoenix and Tucson metro areas in Arizona, the western diamondback rattlesnake can be found thriving deep within developed areas, and encountered by homeowners more often as a result.

== Prey ==
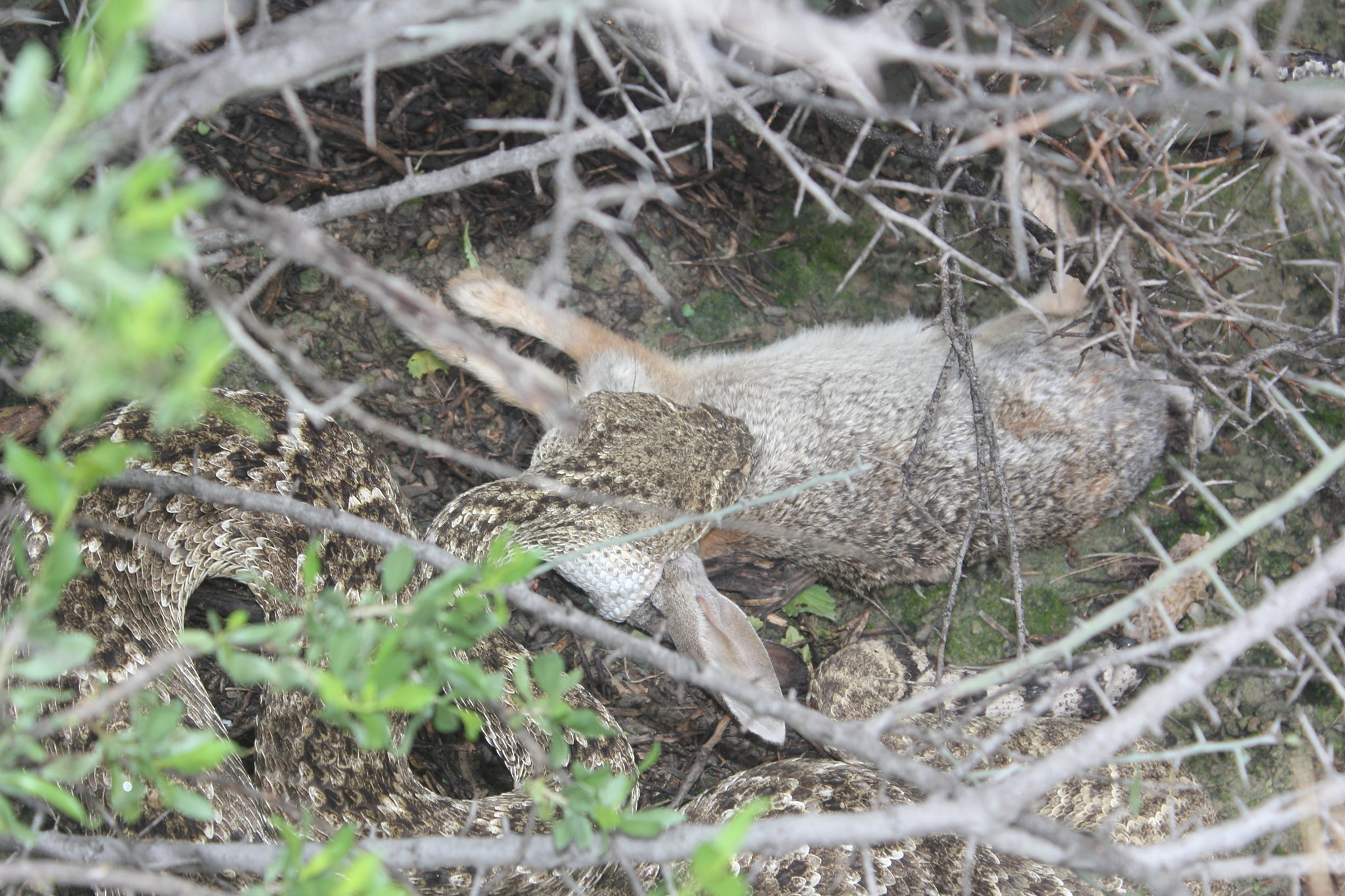
Feeding on an eastern cottontail, in Mexico

A comprehensive study by Beavers (1976) on the prey of C. atrox in Texas showed, by weight, 94.8% of their prey consisted of small mammals. According to Pisani and Stephenson (1991), who conducted a study of the stomach contents of C. atrox in the fall and spring of Oklahoma, mammalian prey included prairie dogs (Cynomys ludovicianus), kangaroo rats (Dipodomys ordii), pocket gophers (Geomys bursarius and Cratogeomys castanops), voles (Microtus ochrogaster), woodrats (Neotoma floridana), pocket mice (Perognathus hispidus and P. flavescens), white-footed mice (Peromyscus leucopus and P. maniculatus), Old World rats and mice (Rattus norvegicus and Mus ssp.), harvest mice (Reithrodontomys megalotis), fox squirrels (Sciurus niger), cotton rats (Sigmodon hispidus), ground squirrels (Spermophilus spilosoma), rabbits (Sylvilagus floridanus), jackrabbits (Lepus californicus), and an unidentified mole species. Klauber mentioned large specimens are capable of swallowing adult cottontail rabbits and even adult jackrabbits, although he figured the latter required confirmation.

Birds, lizards, amphibians, fish, invertebrates, and mice are also preyed upon, with lizards mostly being eaten by young snakes. Avian prey include mockingbirds (Mimidae), quail, a nearly full-grown Gambel's quail, a burrowing owl (Athene cunicularia), a fledgling horned lark (Eremophila alpestris) a black-throated sparrow (Amphispiza bilineata), and an eastern meadowlark (Sturnella magna). Lizard prey include a whiptail lizard (Cnemidophorus), spiny lizards (Sceloporus), a Texas banded gecko (Coleonyx brevis), and a side-blotched lizard (Uta palmeri). One case reported by Vorhies (1948) involved a juvenile specimen that had attempted to eat a horned lizard (Phrynosoma solare), but died after the lizard's horns had punctured its esophagus, leaving the lizard stuck there.

Hermann (1950) reported C. atrox also feeds on lubber grasshoppers (Brachystola magna). Klauber (1972) once found a single specimen in which the stomach contents included grasshoppers, beetles, and ants. However, mammal hairs and an iguanid lizard were also found in the same stomach, which made it more likely that the insects had first been eaten by the mammal or the lizard before they had been eaten by the snake.

They hunt (or ambush prey) at night or in the early morning.

These snakes can go for up to two years without food in the wild. A 5 1/2-month starvation study showed the snakes reduced energy expenditures by an average of 80% over the length of the study. The snakes also feed from within on energy-rich lipid stores. The most interesting finding was the snakes grew during the study, indicating while the snake's mass was shrinking, it was putting its resources into skeletal muscles and bone.

A key participant in the food chain, it is an important predator of many small rodents, rabbits, and birds. In turn, it is preyed upon by a variety of larger mammals and birds, such as coyotes, foxes, hawks, and owls. Crotalus atrox can be active at any time of the day or night when conditions are favorable. It is primarily diurnal and crepuscular in spring and fall and becomes primarily nocturnal and crepuscular during the hot summer months. It is also an intermediate host of an intestinal acanthocephalan parasitic worm, Pachysentis canicola.

They are one of the few species of snakes that engage in scavenging behavior.

== Venom ==
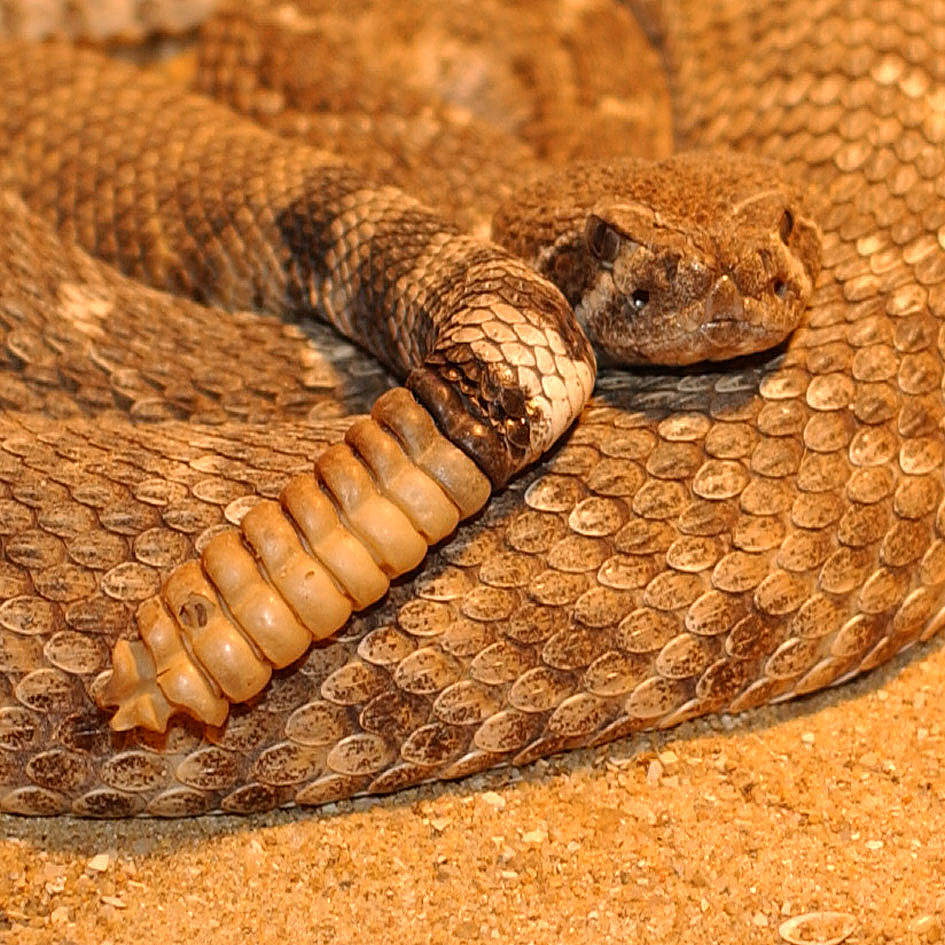
C. atrox

Like that of most other American pit vipers, the venom contains proteolytic enzymes. Proteolytic venoms are concentrated secretions that destroy structural tissues and proteins via catabolism, which help in disabling prey. The venom of C. atrox is primarily hemotoxic, affecting mainly the blood vessels, blood cells and the heart. The venom contains hemorrhagic components called zinc metalloproteinases. The venom also contains cytotoxins and myotoxins which destroy cells and muscles, adding to the damage to the cardiovascular system. In addition to hemorrhage, venom metalloproteinases induce myonecrosis (skeletal muscle damage), which seems to be secondary to the ischemia that ensues in muscle tissue as a consequence of bleeding and reduced perfusion. Microvascular disruption by metalloproteinases also impairs skeletal muscle regeneration, being thereby responsible for fibrosis and permanent tissue loss. General local effects include pain, heavy internal bleeding, severe swelling, severe muscle damage, bruising, blistering, and necrosis; systemic effects are variable and not specific, but may include headache, nausea, vomiting, abdominal pain, diarrhea, dizziness, and convulsions. Bleeding caused by hemorrhagins is a major clinical effect that can be fatal.

This species has LD_{50} values of 2.72 mg/kg intravenous, 20 mg/kg intramuscular and 18.5 mg/kg subcutaneous, which is far less toxic than many other rattlesnakes. However, because of its large venom glands and specialized fangs, the western diamondback rattlesnake can deliver a large amount of venom in a single bite. The average venom yield per bite is usually between 250 and 350 mg, with a maximum of 700–800 mg. Severe envenomation is rare but possible, and can be lethal. Mortality rate of untreated bites is between 10 and 20%.

== Reproduction ==
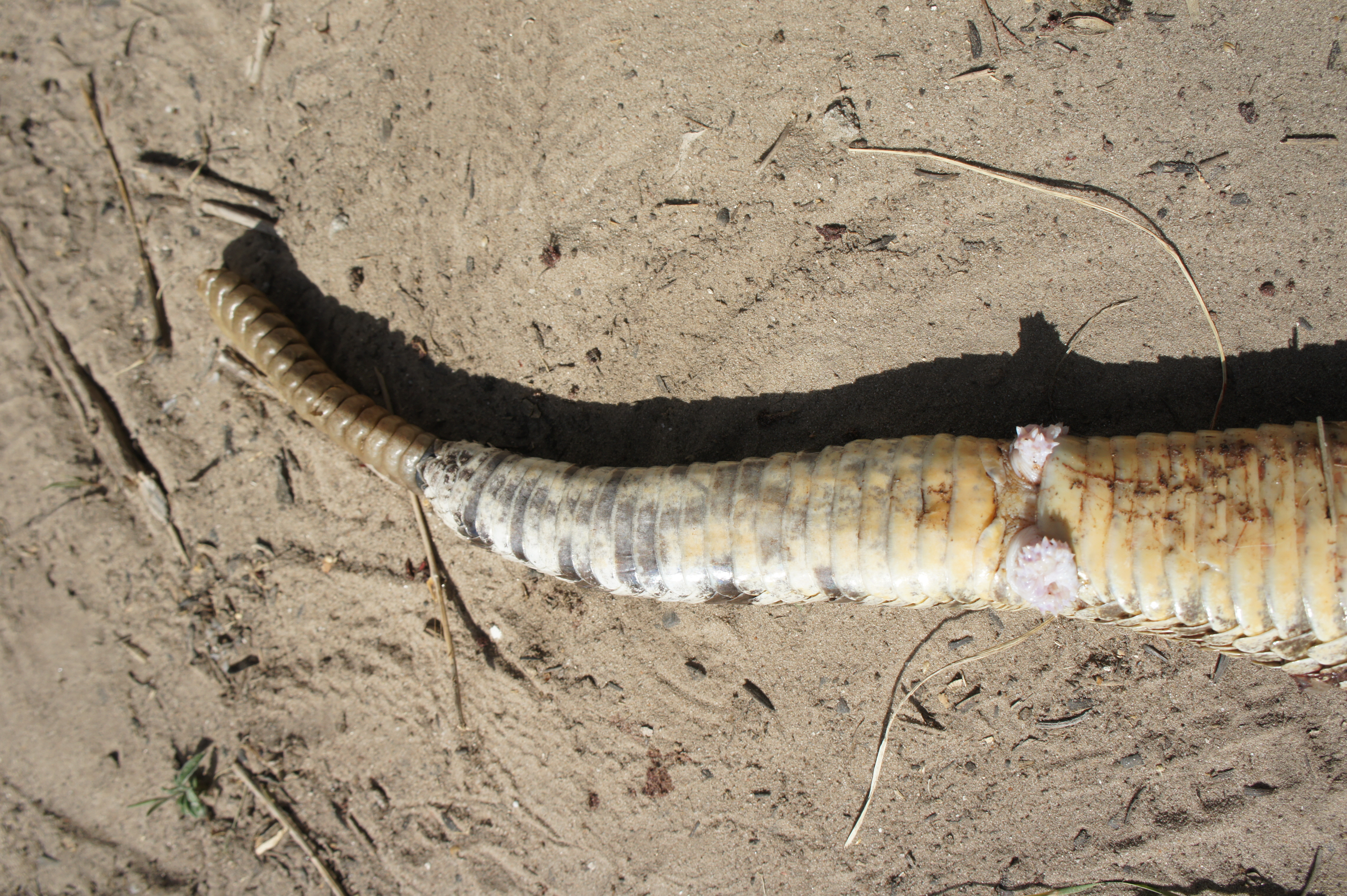
A male Crotalus atrox with a pair of intromittent organs called hemipenes, used for reproduction

Rattlesnakes, including C. atrox, are viviparous. Gestation lasts six or seven months, and broods average about a dozen young. However, the young stay with the mother for only a few hours before they set off on their own to hunt and find cover, so that the mortality rate is very high. Mating occurs in the fall, and the females give birth to as many as 25 young, which may be as long as 30 cm (12 in). The young can deliver a venomous bite from the moment they are born.

== Conservation status ==
This species is classified as Least Concern on the IUCN Red List (v3.1, 2001). Species are listed as such due to their wide distribution or presumed large population, or because they are unlikely to be declining fast enough to qualify for listing in a more threatened category. The population trend was stable when assessed in 2007.

They are also heavily collected from the wild, frequently being drawn out of their hiding places with gasoline and used in rattlesnake roundups, where they are killed for food, skins and entertainment.

This Western diamondback rattlesnake may be the most common rattlesnake species found in homes and in direct conflict with human development in the American Southwest, particularly in the rapidly expanding metro areas of Phoenix and Tucson. Relocation of animals is seen as a sometimes controversial management solution.

== Gallery ==
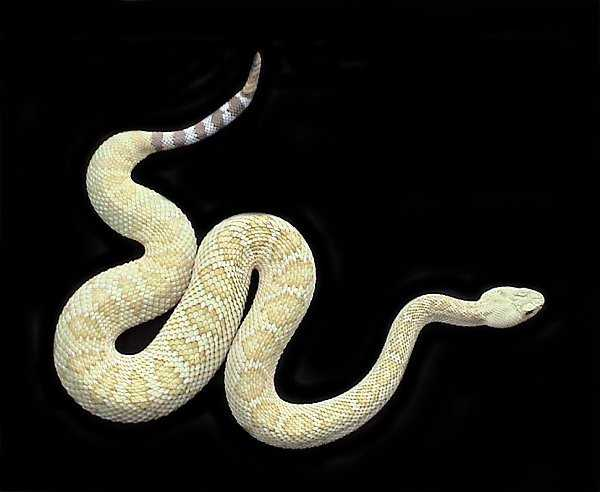
C. atrox, albino specimen

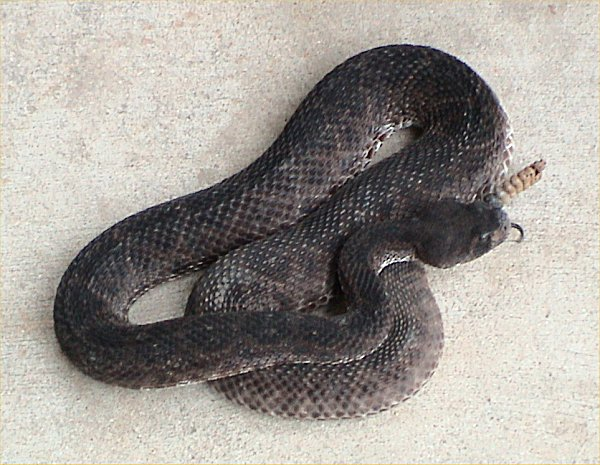
C. atrox, melanistic specimen

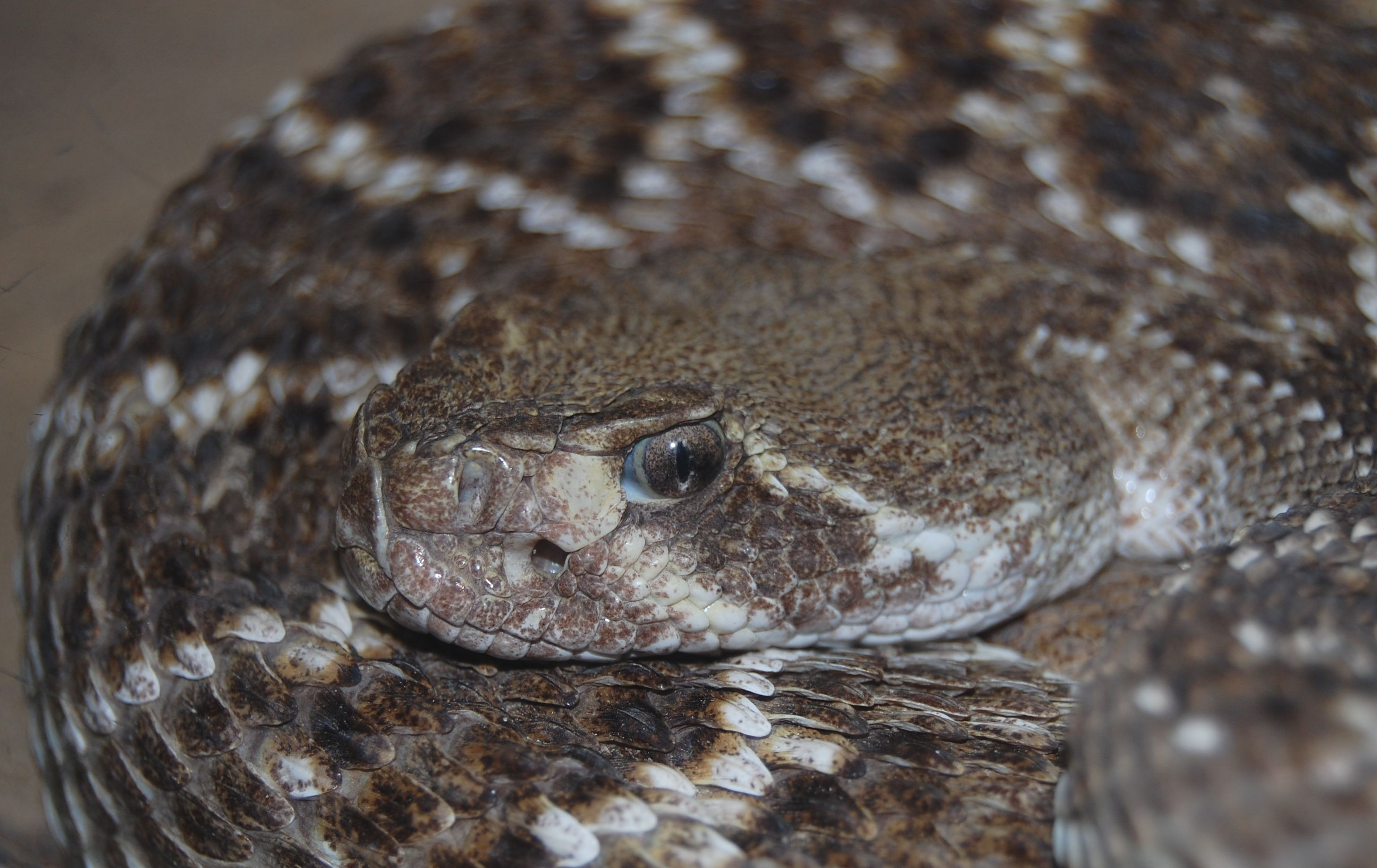
C. atrox

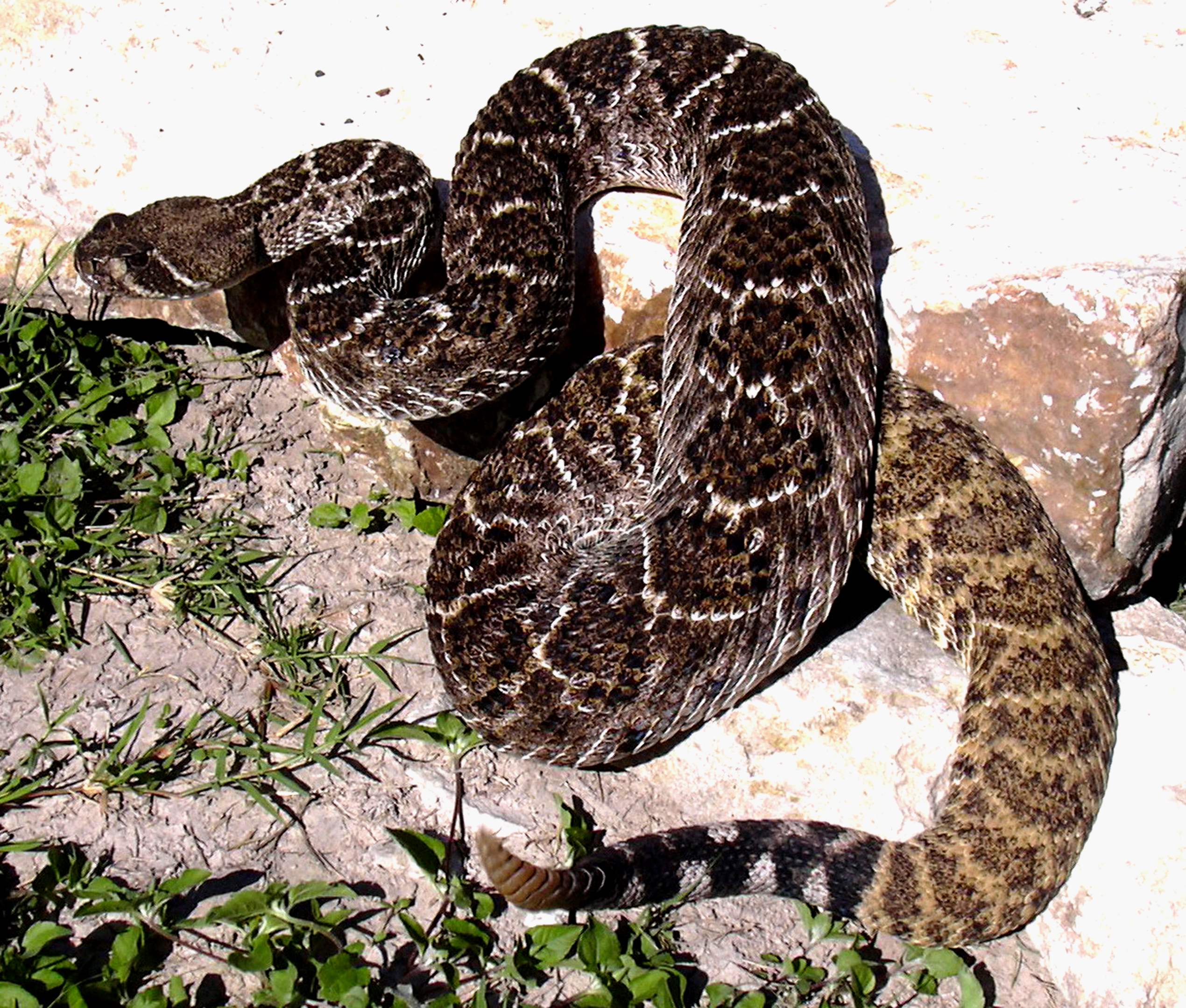
C. atrox
