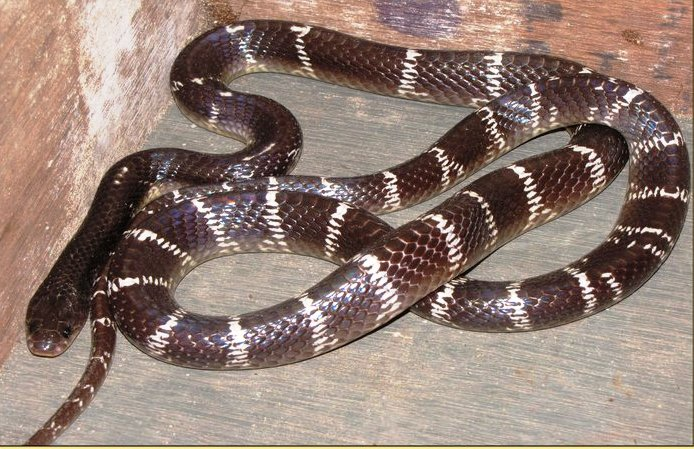

Conservation status
- Least Concern (IUCN 3.1)

Scientific classification
- Kingdom: Animalia
- Phylum: Chordata
- Class: Reptilia
- Order: Squamata
- Suborder: Serpentes
- Family: Elapidae
- Genus: Bungarus
- Species: B. caeruleus

Binomial name
- Bungarus caeruleus (Schneider, 1801)
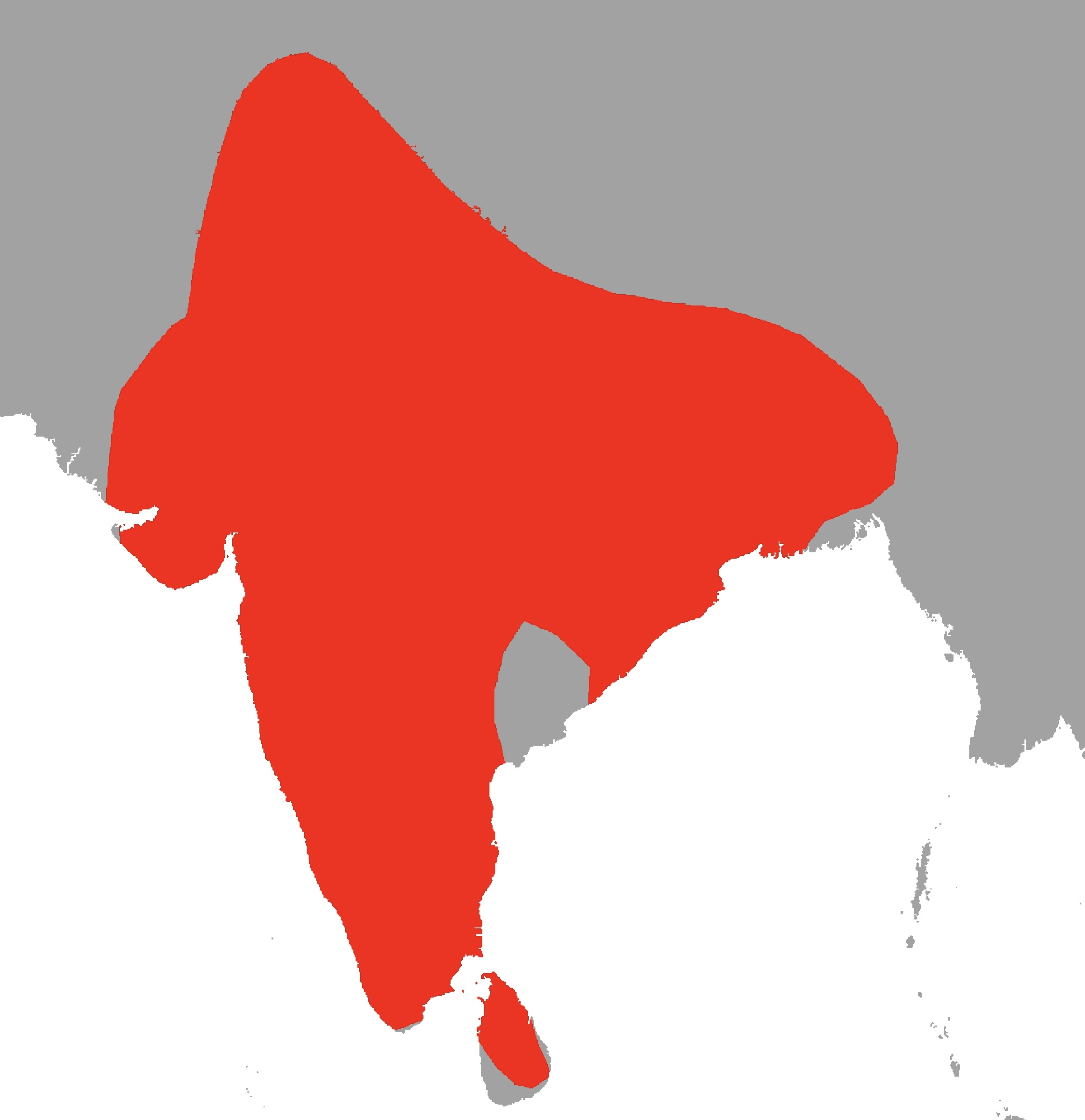

Synonyms
- Pseudoboa caerulea Schneider, 1801, Bungarus candidus var. Cærulus Boulenger, 1896

= Common krait =

Species of snake

The common krait (Bungarus caeruleus) is a highly venomous snake species belonging to the genus Bungarus in the family Elapidae. It has a black or bluish-black body with narrow white crossbands, typically reaching a length of 0.91 to 1.22 m (3 to 4 ft). It is widely distributed across India, Pakistan, Bangladesh, Sri Lanka and Nepal, inhabiting grasslands, agricultural fields, and human settlements. It is known for its potent neurotoxic venom and responsible for the majority of medically significant snakebites in the Indian subcontinent.

== Description ==
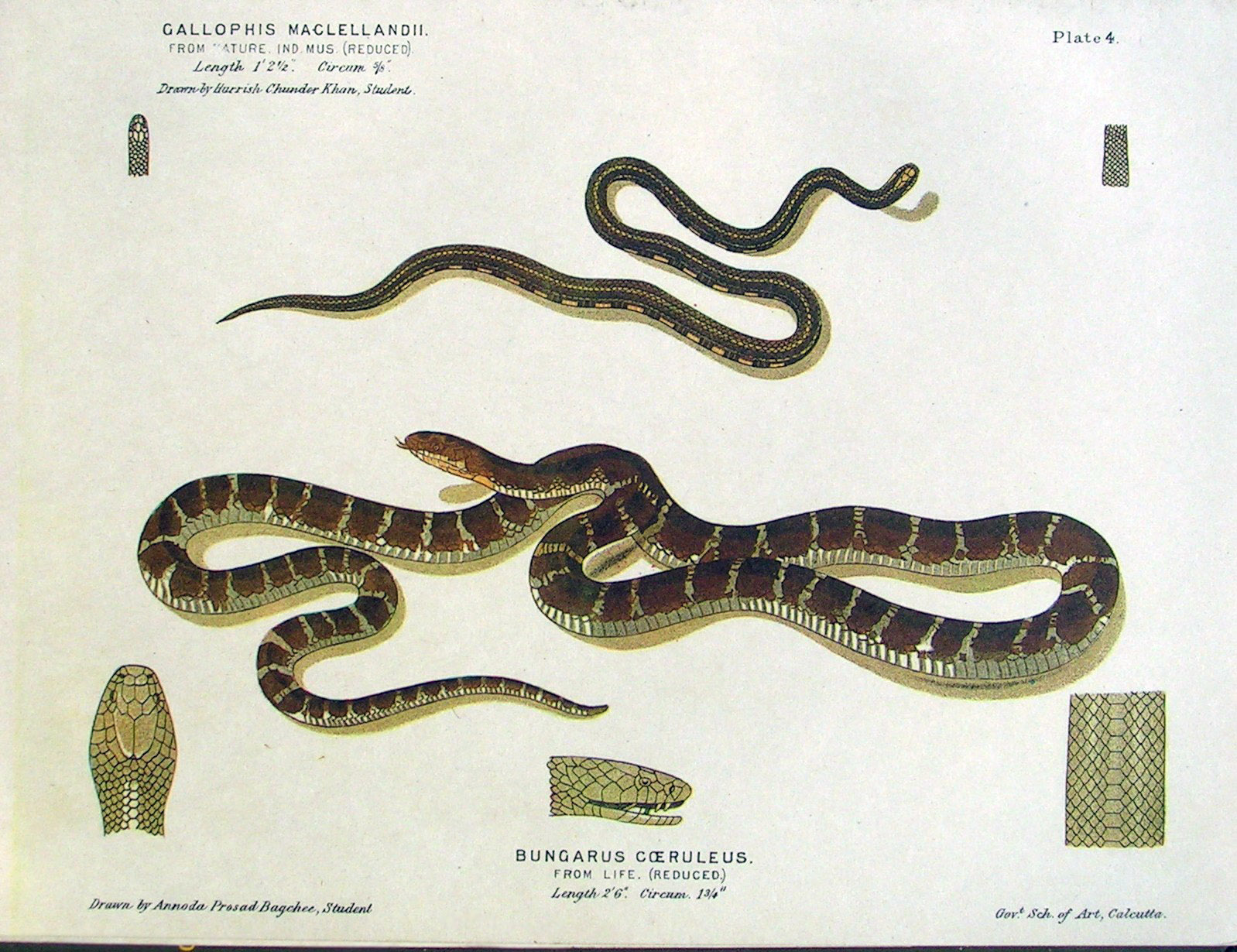
The common krait

The average length of the common krait is 0.9 m (2 ft 11 in), but it can grow to 1.75 m (5 ft 9 in). Males are longer than females, with proportionately longer tails. The head is flat and the neck is hardly visible. The body is cylindrical, tapering towards the tail. The tail is short and rounded. The eyes are rather small, with rounded pupils, indistinguishable in life. The head shields are normal, with no loreals; four shields occur along the margin of the lower lip; the third and fourth supraoculars touch the eye. The scales are highly polished, in 15–17 rows; the vertebral row is distinctly enlarged and hexagonal. Ventrals number 185–225 and caudals 37–50, and are entirely intact. Their coloration is generally black or bluish-black, with about 40 thin, white crossbars, which may be indistinct or absent anteriorly. Albino specimens can be found, although such cases are extremely rare. The pattern, however, is complete and well-defined in the young, which are marked with conspicuous crossbars even anteriorly; in old individuals, the narrow white lines may be found as a series of connected spots, with a prominent spot on the vertebral region. A white preocular spot may be present; the upper lips and belly are white.

== Distribution and habitat ==
The common krait is widely distributed across South Asia, including India, Pakistan, Bangladesh, Sri Lanka, Nepal and possibly Bhutan. Its range extends westward into Afghanistan and potentially parts of Iran. Within India, it occurs throughout the country including the Andaman and Nicobar Islands.

This snake inhabits a diverse range of environments, including scrub jungles, grasslands, agricultural fields, semi-desert areas, rocky terrains, and suburban gardens. It is frequently found in human-modified landscapes such as plantations and cultivated lands. The common krait often takes refuge in termite mounds, rat burrows, or under debris. It is particularly associated with areas near water sources, such as streams, canals, and ponds.

The common krait demonstrates high adaptability to various habitats and is common in rural areas, where rodent populations are abundant. During the monsoon season, it often enters houses in search of shelter or prey. This adaptability has contributed to its stable population despite localized threats, such as habitat fragmentation and persecution.

== Behaviour and ecology ==
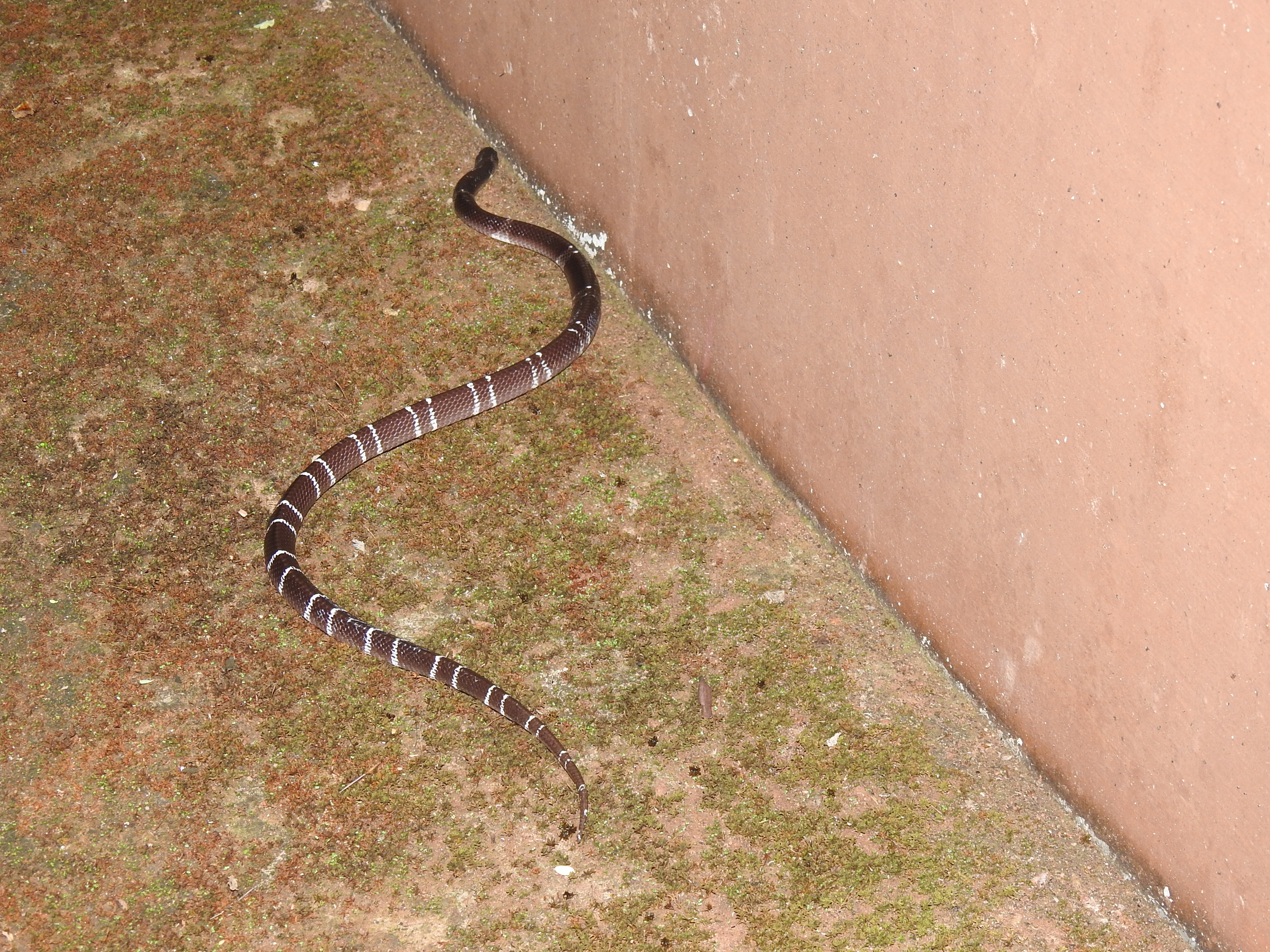
Common krait

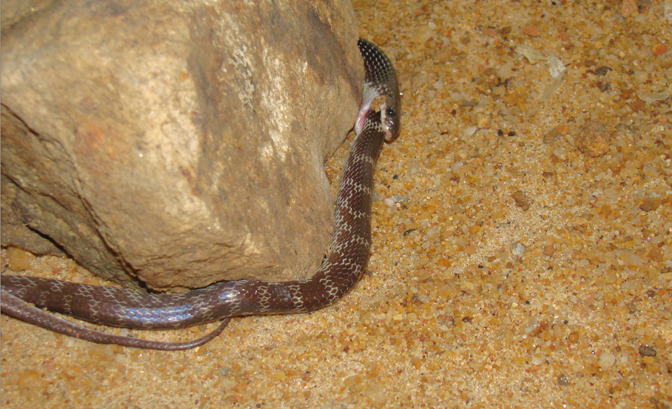
Common krait eating a wolf snake (Lycodon aulicus)

The common krait is a nocturnal snake, most active during the night when it hunts for prey and moves about its environment. During the day, it remains inactive and hides in concealed locations such as rodent burrows, termite mounds, or under debris. This secretive behavior makes it difficult to spot during daylight hours. Despite its potent venom, the common krait is generally non-aggressive and prefers to avoid confrontation. When threatened, it often coils itself tightly with its head tucked underneath as a defensive posture. It may flatten its body or make sudden movements as a warning but rarely bites unless provoked. At night, however, it can become more active and aggressive if disturbed. Records of people sleeping on the ground getting bitten are common.

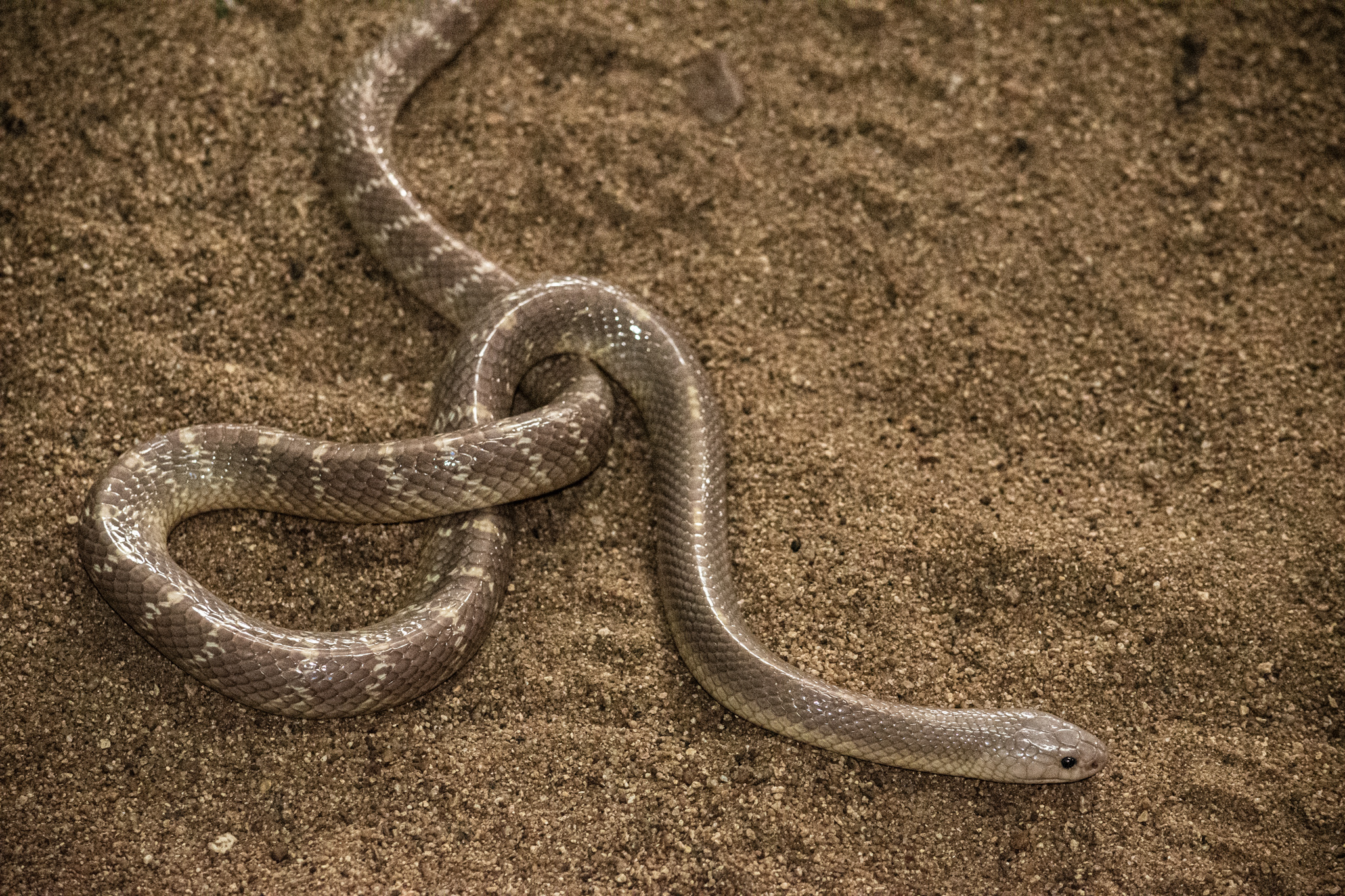
A rare case of albinism in kraits

=== Diet ===
The common krait feeds primarily on other snakes, including venomous snakes like other kraits and vipers. It also feeds on small rodents, lizards, birds and frogs.

=== Reproduction ===
The common krait is oviparous. Females lay clutches of 5–15 eggs during late winter or summer months in secluded areas such as leaf litter or burrows. Unlike many snake species, female kraits exhibit parental care by guarding their eggs until they hatch after about 60 days. The hatchlings emerge fully independent and equipped with venom from birth. The males are known to engage in combat displays.

== Venom ==
The common krait is responsible for the majority of medically significant snakebites in the Indian subcontinent as its neurotoxic venom is one of the most potent venoms on humans among Indian snakes. Bites without envenomation, i.e. dry bites are not uncommon. In mice, the LD_{50} values of its venom are 0.325 mg/kg subcutaneously, 0.169 mg/kg intravenously, and 0.089 mg/kg intraperitoneally. The average venom yield is 10 mg (0.15 gr) dry weight. The estimated lethal dose for humans is 2–3 mg (0.031–0.046 gr).

=== Venom composition ===
The venom is dominated by phospholipases A2 (PLA2), constituting approximately 64.5% of its proteome, with presynaptic β-bungarotoxins (similar to β-caerulotoxins) being the primary neurotoxic components. These toxins irreversibly damage motor nerve terminals by depleting synaptic vesicles and disrupting acetylcholine release, leading to neuromuscular blockade. Additionally, 15–19% of the venom consists of postsynaptic α-neurotoxins (κ-bungarotoxins), which competitively inhibit nicotinic acetylcholine receptors at neuromuscular junctions. Notably, the venom lacks pro-coagulant or cytotoxic agents, explaining the absence of local tissue damage or swelling at bite sites.

The common krait is nocturnal and seldom encounters humans during daylight; incidents occur mainly at night. The snake has relatively small fangs and frequently, little or no pain occurs from the bite, which may go unnoticed especially if the victim is sleeping and the minimal pain may provide false reassurance to the victim. Bites also generally present minimal to no local effects, like swelling or bleeding at the site. These characteristics often makes it difficult to locate the bite site in some cases. Typically, victims complain of severe abdominal cramps and shortness of breath accompanied by progressive paralysis. The clinical progression is rapid and death may follow in about 4–8 hours if untreated. Cause of death is general respiratory failure, i.e. suffocation.

The few symptoms of the bite include tightening of the facial muscles in 1–2 hours of the bite and inability of the bite victim to see or talk, and if left untreated, the patient may die from respiratory paralysis within 4–5 hours. A clinical toxicology study reports an untreated mortality rate as high as 70–80%. Resistance against treatment with polyvalent antivenom is likely once paralysis has set in, and hence sometimes immediate administration of antivenoms is suggested regardless of neurotoxic symptom presentation. Neostigmine, an anticholinesterase, which is effective in neutralizing postsynaptic neurotoxins such as those of cobras, is not useful against the venom of common krait or the Russell's viper, which predominantly consists of presynaptic neurotoxins.

Current antivenoms, while life-saving, require optimization to address biogeographic venom variations and improve neutralization potency across its range.
