= LNTX-1 =

Neurotoxin found in the venom of the king cobra (Ophioophagus hannah)

Long neurotoxin 1 (LNTX-1) is a neurotoxin that binds antagonistically to all types of muscular and neuronal nicotinic acetylcholine receptors. LNTX-1 is found in the venom of the king cobra (Ophioophagus hannah).

== Etymology ==
LNTX-1 is an acronym for long neurotoxin 1. The “long” refers to the long-chain classification based on mature protein length of the neurotoxin, which is 66-79 amino acid residues long. There are more long neurotoxins found in snakes, such as LNTX-2 and LNTX-3.

== Sources ==
LNTX-1 is produced by Ophioophagus hannah (king cobra), which is found in large parts of Asia. LNTX-1 is only one of the compounds of the cocktails of alpha-neurotoxins that this snake produces, making a venomous injection extremely lethal.

== Chemistry ==
LNTX-1 belongs to the three-finger toxin family (3FTx) of snake venom toxins. The “three-finger” name refers to the fact that there are distinct three β-strand loops extending from the central globular core. The core of LNTX-1 is rich in disulphide bonds: it has ten conserved cysteine residues, which form five disulphide bridges. The 3FTx family consists of two major categories, neurotoxins and cardiotoxins. LNTX belongs to the neurotoxin family; other members include SNTXs (short chain neurotoxins), WNTXs (weak neurotoxins) and MTXs (muscarinic toxins). The particular 3FTx-subtype LNTX-1 falls within the long-chain subfamily and the type II α-neurotoxin sub-subfamily. The toxin targets both muscular and neuronal acetylcholine receptors. This dual action is attributed to its structure of eight conserved amino acid residues, Trp25, Asp27, Phe29, Arg33, Arg36, Phe65, Lys23 and Lys49. However, Lys23 and Lys49 residues are only required for muscular acetylcholine receptor binding.

== Target and Mode of Action ==
LNTX-1 has a high affinity for the nicotinic acetylcholine receptor (nAChr) located at both the neuromuscular and neuronal junctions. Short chain toxins (see Chemistry) are only able to bind to the muscular nicotinic acetylcholine receptors, whereas long chain toxins can also bind to neuronal nicotinic acetylcholine receptors. The binding to the neuronal receptor is facilitated by the fifth disulphide bond of LNTX-1 (see Chemistry). This bond binds to the α-7-subunit to exert an inhibitory effect. The toxin behaves as an irreversible antagonist, occupying a binding site whereby acetylcholine would otherwise bind. The result of this antagonistic mode of inhibitory action by LNTX-1 is observed by decreased muscular and neuronal transmission. In addition, the toxin is also cytolytic, meaning that when the toxin has entered the bloodstream an osmotic imbalance between cells and their extracellular surrounding occurs, causing the cells to burst.

== Toxicity ==
The LD50 of LNTX-1 is determined at 0,51 mg/kg by intravenous injection of the venom in mice. The IC50 value for LNTX-1 is 0,763 μM when the toxin is applied to human cells. The binding of LNTX-1 to the acetylcholine receptors leads to a loss of function in neuronal and neuromuscular transmission. The resulting symptoms include immobilization and asphyxiation which can be lethal to the subject that is infected by the toxin.
