= Α-Bungarotoxin =

Chemical compound

α-Bungarotoxin
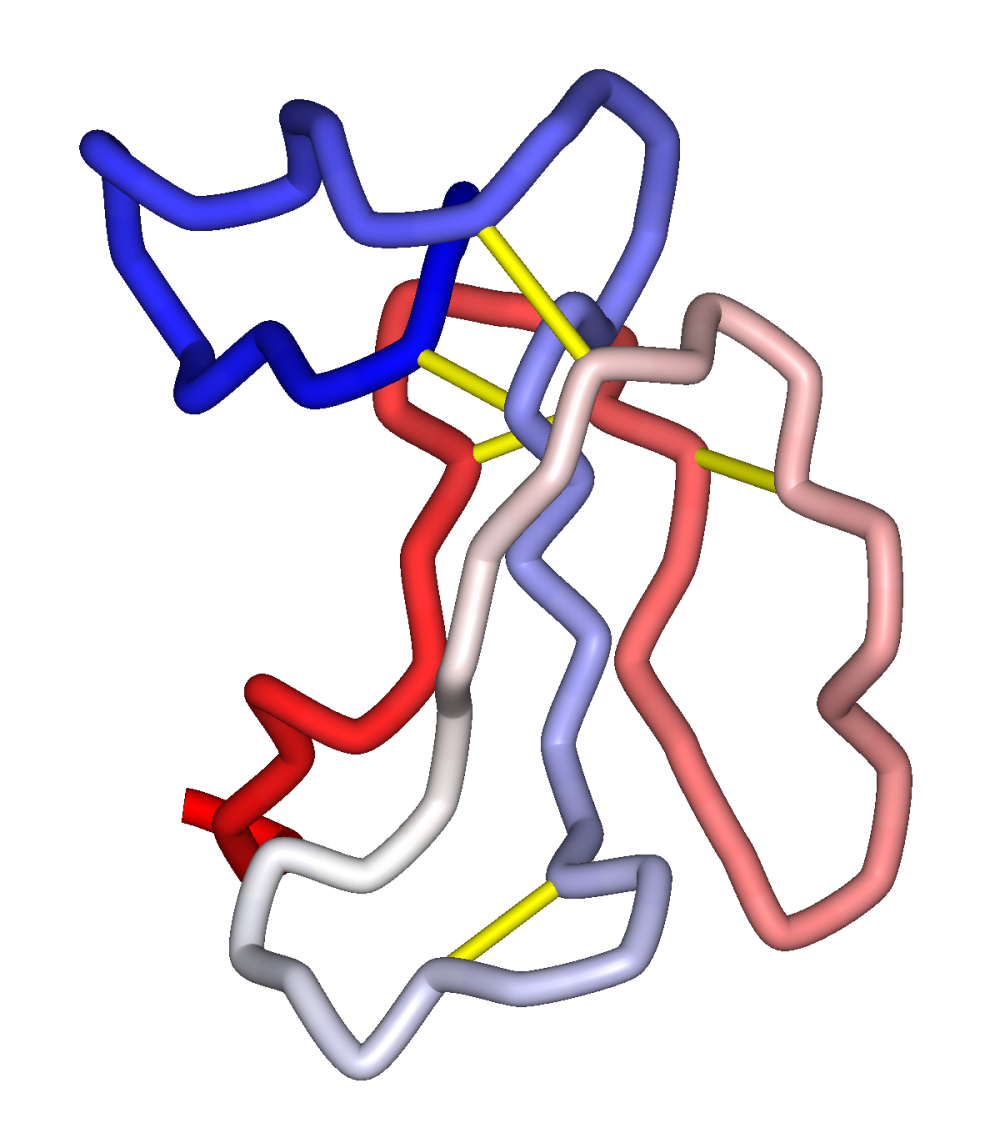
- Schematic diagram of the three-dimensional structure of α-bungarotoxin. Disulfide bonds shown in gold. From PDB: 1IDI.

Identifiers
- Organism: Bungarus multicinctus
- Symbol: ?
- CAS number: 11032-79-4
- Orthologs: OMA: entry
- UniProt: P60616
Search for
- Structures: Swiss-model
- Domains: InterPro

α-Bungarotoxin
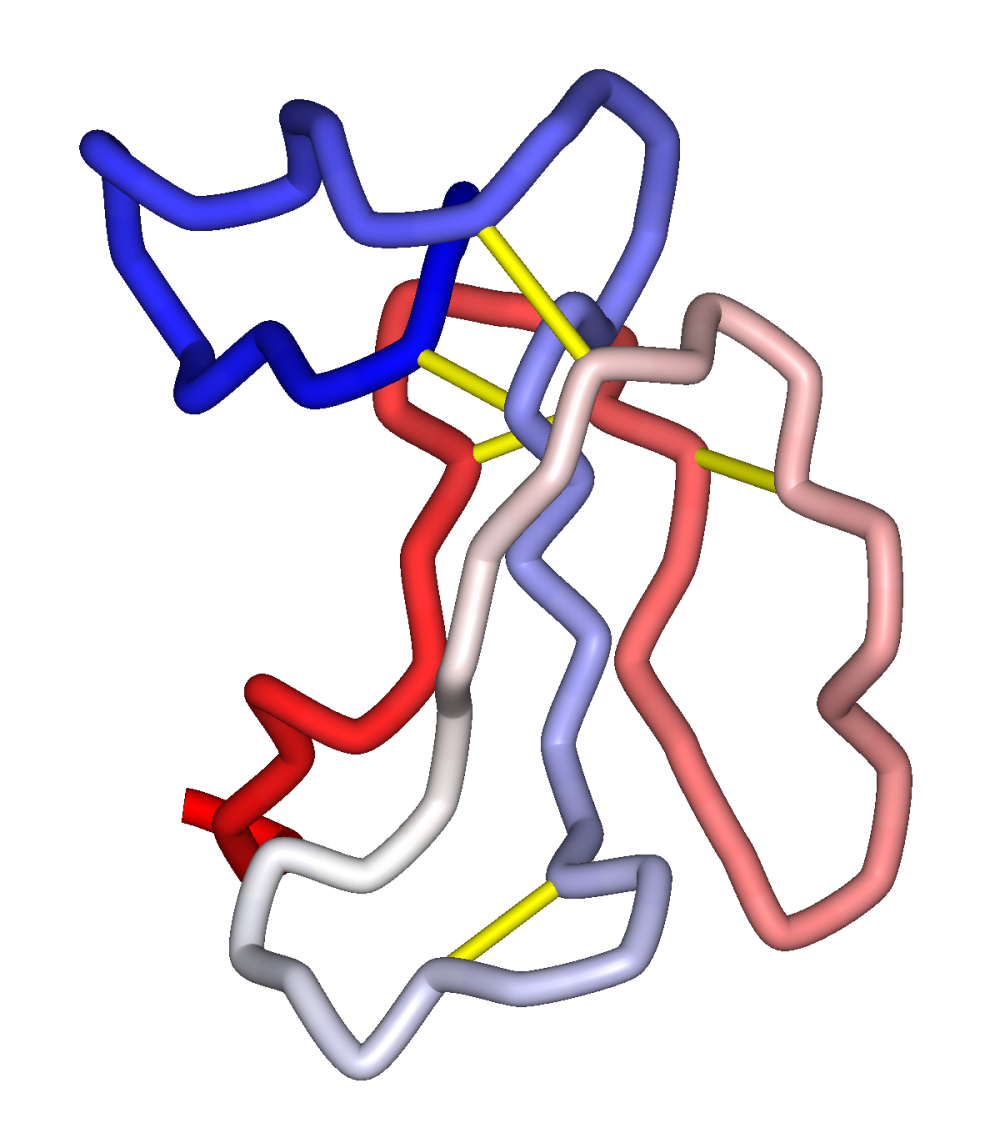

Names
- Other names Alpha-Bgt, Alpha-BTX

Identifiers
CAS Number	11032-79-4
3D model (JSmol)	Interactive image; immature peptide: Interactive image
ECHA InfoCard	100.031.139
CompTox Dashboard (EPA)	DTXSID10897185
- InChI: InChI=1S/C340H533N97O105S11/c1-33-166(19)253(350)315(520)420-255(161(9)10)318(523)412-228-152-550-546-147-223-301(506)391-206(124-180-84-88-185(451)89-85-180)287(492)379-195(74-53-110-360-339(353)354)276(481)377-191(68-41-47-104-342)274(479)384-201(102-120-543-32)283(488)392-209(126-182-133-362-188-66-39-38-65-187(182)188)290(495)410-224-148-545-548-150-226(409-289(494)208(123-179-63-36-35-37-64-179)397-317(522)254(160(7)8)419-294(499)213(132-251(469)470)395-302(224)507)305(510)402-218(142-440)298(503)401-217(141-439)296(501)376-189(73-52-109-359-338(351)352)272(477)363-136-243(456)373-190(67-40-46-103-341)284(489)417-258(164(15)16)319(524)421-256(162(11)12)316(521)386-199(95-100-248(463)464)282(487)389-204(121-158(3)4)273(478)364-137-245(458)375-222(146-544-552-155-231(336(541)437-119-62-83-239(437)337(542)436-118-56-77-233(436)308(513)365-138-244(457)374-196(93-98-246(459)460)279(484)394-211(129-241(348)454)291(496)390-205(122-159(5)6)286(491)408-223)415-328(533)266(177(30)449)428-320(525)257(163(13)14)416-269(474)170(23)370-295(500)216(140-438)405-322(527)260(167(20)34-2)422-314(519)238-82-61-116-434(238)334(539)221(145-443)406-325(530)262(173(26)445)423-271(476)171(24)372-323(528)261(172(25)444)429-329(534)267(178(31)450)425-293(498)210(393-303(228)508)127-183-134-357-156-367-183)300(505)371-168(21)268(473)369-169(22)270(475)424-263(174(27)446)327(532)414-230-154-553-551-153-229(413-326(531)265(176(29)448)427-321(526)259(165(17)18)418-285(490)200(96-101-249(465)466)382-280(485)198(94-99-247(461)462)383-288(493)207(125-181-86-90-186(452)91-87-181)396-311(516)235-79-57-113-431(235)330(535)202(72-45-51-108-346)387-277(482)192(69-42-48-105-343)380-297(502)219(143-441)404-313(518)237-81-60-117-435(237)335(230)540)307(512)411-227-151-549-547-149-225(407-278(483)193(70-43-49-106-344)378-292(497)212(131-250(467)468)398-324(529)264(175(28)447)426-299(504)220(144-442)403-306(227)511)304(509)399-215(130-242(349)455)333(538)433-115-59-80-236(433)312(517)400-214(128-184-135-358-157-368-184)332(537)432-114-58-78-234(432)310(515)385-194(71-44-50-107-345)275(480)381-197(92-97-240(347)453)281(486)388-203(75-54-111-361-340(355)356)331(536)430-112-55-76-232(430)309(514)366-139-252(471)472/h35-39,63-66,84-91,133-135,156-178,189-239,253-267,362,438-452H,33-34,40-62,67-83,92-132,136-155,341-346,350H2,1-32H3,(H2,347,453)(H2,348,454)(H2,349,455)(H,357,367)(H,358,368)(H,363,477)(H,364,478)(H,365,513)(H,366,514)(H,369,473)(H,370,500)(H,371,505)(H,372,528)(H,373,456)(H,374,457)(H,375,458)(H,376,501)(H,377,481)(H,378,497)(H,379,492)(H,380,502)(H,381,480)(H,382,485)(H,383,493)(H,384,479)(H,385,515)(H,386,521)(H,387,482)(H,388,486)(H,389,487)(H,390,496)(H,391,506)(H,392,488)(H,393,508)(H,394,484)(H,395,507)(H,396,516)(H,397,522)(H,398,529)(H,399,509)(H,400,517)(H,401,503)(H,402,510)(H,403,511)(H,404,518)(H,405,527)(H,406,530)(H,407,483)(H,408,491)(H,409,494)(H,410,495)(H,411,512)(H,412,523)(H,413,531)(H,414,532)(H,415,533)(H,416,474)(H,417,489)(H,418,490)(H,419,499)(H,420,520)(H,421,524)(H,422,519)(H,423,476)(H,424,475)(H,425,498)(H,426,504)(H,427,526)(H,428,525)(H,429,534)(H,459,460)(H,461,462)(H,463,464)(H,465,466)(H,467,468)(H,469,470)(H,471,472)(H4,351,352,359)(H4,353,354,360)(H4,355,356,361)/t166-,167-,168-,169-,170-,171-,172+,173+,174+,175+,176+,177+,178+,189-,190-,191-,192-,193-,194-,195-,196-,197-,198-,199-,200-,201-,202-,203-,204-,205-,206-,207-,208-,209-,210-,211-,212-,213-,214-,215-,216-,217-,218-,219-,220-,221-,222-,223-,224-,225-,226-,227-,228-,229-,230-,231-,232-,233-,234-,235-,236-,237-,238-,239-,253-,254-,255-,256-,257-,258-,259-,260-,261-,262-,263-,264-,265-,266-,267-/m0/s1 Key: FWTYIJYGYVJTAZ-YFSMYVERSA-N
- SMILES: N[C@@H]([C@H](CC)C)C(=O)N[C@@H](C(C)C)C(=O)N[C@@H](CS3)C(=O)N[C@@H](CC1=CN=C-N1)C(=O)N[C@@H]([C@H](O)C)C(=O)N[C@@H]([C@H](O)C)C(=O)N[C@@H](C)C(=O)N[C@@H]([C@H](O)C)C(=O)N[C@@H](CO)C(=O)N1[C@@H](CCC1)C(=O)N[C@@H]([C@H](CC)C)C(=O)N[C@@H](CO)C(=O)N[C@@H](C)C(=O)N[C@@H](C(C)C)C(=O)N[C@@H]([C@H](O)C)C(=O)N[C@@H](CS4)C(=O)N1[C@@H](CCC1)C(=O)N1[C@@H](CCC1)C(=O)NCC(=O)N[C@@H](CCC(=O)O)C(=O)N[C@@H](CC(=O)N)C(=O)N[C@@H](CC(C)C)C(=O)N[C@@H](CS3)C(=O)N[C@@H](Cc1ccc(O)cc1)C(=O)N[C@@H](CCCNC(=N)N)C(=O)N[C@@H](CCCCN)C(=O)N[C@@H](CCSC)C(=O)N[C@@H](CC(=CN2)C1=C2C=CC=C1)C(=O)N[C@@H](CS5)C(=O)N[C@@H](CC(=O)O)C(=O)N[C@@H](C(C)C)C(=O)N[C@@H](Cc1ccccc1)C(=O)N[C@@H](CS5)C(=O)N[C@@H](CO)C(=O)N[C@@H](CO)C(=O)N[C@@H](CCCNC(=N)N)C(=O)NCC(=O)N[C@@H](CCCCN)C(=O)N[C@@H](C(C)C)C(=O)N[C@@H](C(C)C)C(=O)N[C@@H](CCC(=O)O)C(=O)N[C@@H](CC(C)C)C(=O)NCC(=O)N[C@@H](CS4)C(=O)N[C@@H](C)C(=O)N[C@@H](C)C(=O)N[C@@H]([C@H](O)C)C(=O)N[C@@H](CS6)C(=O)N1[C@@H](CCC1)C(=O)N[C@@H](CO)C(=O)N[C@@H](CCCCN)C(=O)N[C@@H](CCCCN)C(=O)N1[C@@H](CCC1)C(=O)N[C@@H](Cc1ccc(O)cc1)C(=O)N[C@@H](CCC(=O)O)C(=O)N[C@@H](CCC(=O)O)C(=O)N[C@@H](C(C)C)C(=O)N[C@@H]([C@H](O)C)C(=O)N[C@@H](CS6)C(=O)N[C@@H](CS7)C(=O)N[C@@H](CO)C(=O)N[C@@H]([C@H](O)C)C(=O)N[C@@H](CC(=O)O)C(=O)N[C@@H](CCCCN)C(=O)N[C@@H](CS7)C(=O)N[C@@H](CC(=O)N)C(=O)N1[C@@H](CCC1)C(=O)N[C@@H](CC1=CN=C-N1)C(=O)N1[C@@H](CCC1)C(=O)N[C@@H](CCCCN)C(=O)N[C@@H](CCC(=O)N)C(=O)N[C@@H](CCCNC(=N)N)C(=O)N1[C@@H](CCC1)C(=O)NCC(=O)O; immature peptide: N[C@@H](CCSC)C(=O)N[C@@H](CCCCN)C(=O)N[C@@H]([C@H](O)C)C(=O)N[C@@H](CC(C)C)C(=O)N[C@@H](CC(C)C)C(=O)N[C@@H](CC(C)C)C(=O)N[C@@H]([C@H](O)C)C(=O)N[C@@H](CC(C)C)C(=O)N[C@@H](C(C)C)C(=O)N[C@@H](C(C)C)C(=O)N[C@@H](C(C)C)C(=O)N[C@@H]([C@H](O)C)C(=O)N[C@@H]([C@H](CC)C)C(=O)N[C@@H](C(C)C)C(=O)N[C@@H](CS)C(=O)N[C@@H](CC(C)C)C(=O)N[C@@H](CC(=O)O)C(=O)N[C@@H](CC(C)C)C(=O)NCC(=O)N[C@@H](Cc1ccc(O)cc1)C(=O)N[C@@H]([C@H](O)C)C(=O)N[C@@H]([C@H](CC)C)C(=O)N[C@@H](C(C)C)C(=O)N[C@@H](CS)C(=O)N[C@@H](CC1=CN=C-N1)C(=O)N[C@@H]([C@H](O)C)C(=O)N[C@@H]([C@H](O)C)C(=O)N[C@@H](C)C(=O)N[C@@H]([C@H](O)C)C(=O)N[C@@H](CO)C(=O)N1[C@@H](CCC1)C(=O)N[C@@H]([C@H](CC)C)C(=O)N[C@@H](CO)C(=O)N[C@@H](C)C(=O)N[C@@H](C(C)C)C(=O)N[C@@H]([C@H](O)C)C(=O)N[C@@H](CS)C(=O)N1[C@@H](CCC1)C(=O)N1[C@@H](CCC1)C(=O)NCC(=O)N[C@@H](CCC(=O)O)C(=O)N[C@@H](CC(=O)N)C(=O)N[C@@H](CC(C)C)C(=O)N[C@@H](CS)C(=O)N[C@@H](Cc1ccc(O)cc1)C(=O)N[C@@H](CCCNC(=N)N)C(=O)N[C@@H](CCCCN)C(=O)N[C@@H](CCSC)C(=O)N[C@@H](CC(=CN2)C1=C2C=CC=C1)C(=O)N[C@@H](CS)C(=O)N[C@@H](CC(=O)O)C(=O)N[C@@H](C(C)C)C(=O)N[C@@H](Cc1ccccc1)C(=O)N[C@@H](CS)C(=O)N[C@@H](CO)C(=O)N[C@@H](CO)C(=O)N[C@@H](CCCNC(=N)N)C(=O)NCC(=O)N[C@@H](CCCCN)C(=O)N[C@@H](C(C)C)C(=O)N[C@@H](C(C)C)C(=O)N[C@@H](CCC(=O)O)C(=O)N[C@@H](CC(C)C)C(=O)NCC(=O)N[C@@H](CS)C(=O)N[C@@H](C)C(=O)N[C@@H](C)C(=O)N[C@@H]([C@H](O)C)C(=O)N[C@@H](CS)C(=O)N1[C@@H](CCC1)C(=O)N[C@@H](CO)C(=O)N[C@@H](CCCCN)C(=O)N[C@@H](CCCCN)C(=O)N1[C@@H](CCC1)C(=O)N[C@@H](Cc1ccc(O)cc1)C(=O)N[C@@H](CCC(=O)O)C(=O)N[C@@H](CCC(=O)O)C(=O)N[C@@H](C(C)C)C(=O)N[C@@H]([C@H](O)C)C(=O)N[C@@H](CS)C(=O)N[C@@H](CS)C(=O)N[C@@H](CO)C(=O)N[C@@H]([C@H](O)C)C(=O)N[C@@H](CC(=O)O)C(=O)N[C@@H](CCCCN)C(=O)N[C@@H](CS)C(=O)N[C@@H](CC(=O)N)C(=O)N1[C@@H](CCC1)C(=O)N[C@@H](CC1=CN=C-N1)C(=O)N1[C@@H](CCC1)C(=O)N[C@@H](CCCCN)C(=O)N[C@@H](CCC(=O)N)C(=O)N[C@@H](CCCNC(=N)N)C(=O)N1[C@@H](CCC1)C(=O)NCC(=O)O

Properties
Chemical formula	C_{340}H_{533}N_{97}O_{105}S_{11}
Molar mass	8012.24 g·mol^{−1}
Appearance	Clear solution
Solubility in water	>10 mg/mL

Hazards
- Occupational safety and health (OHS/OSH)
Main hazards	Toxic
- GHS labelling
Pictograms	(GHS06: Toxic)
Signal word	Danger
- Except where otherwise noted, data are given for materials in their standard state (at 25 °C [77 °F], 100 kPa). Infobox references

α-Bungarotoxin is one of the bungarotoxins, components of the venom of the elapid Taiwanese banded krait snake (Bungarus multicinctus). It is a type of α-neurotoxin, a neurotoxic protein that is known to bind competitively and in a relatively irreversible manner to the nicotinic acetylcholine receptor found at the neuromuscular junction, causing paralysis, respiratory failure, and death in the victim. It has also been shown to play an antagonistic role in the binding of the α7 nicotinic acetylcholine receptor in the brain, and as such has numerous applications in neuroscience research.

== History ==
Bungarotoxins are a group of toxins that are closely related with the neurotoxic proteins predominantly present in the venom of kraits. These toxins are directly linked to the three-finger toxin superfamily. Among them, α-bungarotoxin (α-BTX) stands out, being a peptide toxin produced by the Taiwanese banded krait, also known as the many-banded krait or the Taiwanese or Chinese krait.

The venom of the many-banded krait, like the majority of the snake venoms, involves a combination of proteins that together lead to a remarkable range of neurologic consequences. The Elapid snake family is known for their potent α-neurotoxic venom, which has a postsynaptic mechanism of action. These neurotoxins primarily affect the nervous system, blocking the nerve impulse transmission, leading to paralysis and potentially death if untreated.

In South and Southeast Asia, envenomation from a many-banded krait bite is a common and life-threatening medical condition when not promptly treated. Nevertheless, krait bites usually take place at night and do not show any local symptoms, so victims are not aware of the bite. This can delay medical care, which makes it the major cause of mortality associated with krait venom.

The first time that the many-banded krait was described was in 1861 by the scientist Edward Blyth. It was characterized by its distinctive black-and-white banded pattern along its body, with a maximum length of 1.85 m. This very venomous species is found in central and southern China and Southeast Asia. Their venom contains various neurotoxins, including α-BTX.

== Mechanism ==
According to later research on its mechanism of action, α-bungarotoxin binds irreversibly to the postsynaptic nicotinic acetylcholine receptor (nAChR) at the neuromuscular junction. It inhibits the action of acetylcholine competitively, leading to respiratory failure, paralysis and even death.

α-bungarotoxin specifically targets the nervous system, interfering with the nerve impulse transmission. The primary target of the toxin is the neuromuscular junction of skeletal muscles, where the motor nerve terminal and the nicotinic acetylcholine receptor are the major target sites. Their neurotoxic effect is often referred to as resistant neurotoxicity. This is because of the damage caused to nerve terminals that leads to acetylcholine depletion at the neuromuscular junction. The regeneration of the synapses can take days, which prolongs the paralysis and recovery process for the victim. In addition, the severity of the paralysis ranges from mild to life-threatening depending on the degree of envenomation, its composition and the early therapeutic intervention.

== Treatment ==
Antivenom therapy is the current standard treatment for snake envenoming. In China, the Bungarus multicinctus monovalent antivenom (BMMAV) is produced and, in Taiwan the Neuro bivalent antivenom (NBAV). Both antivenoms are immunoreactive to the neurotoxins found in the venom, including the α-BTX, which neutralize the venom lethality. BMMAV is specifically designed to neutralize the venom of the Bungarus multicinctus, therefore being more efficacious compared to NBAV. On the other hand, NBAV targets the venom from multiple species of snakes that produce neurotoxic effects, including the Bungarus multicinctus. The use of BMMAV or NBAV might differ based on availability, regional protocols and the specific venomous snake that is present in the area.

== Structure and available forms ==
α-Bungarotoxin consists of an 8 kDa, single polypeptide chain that contains 74 amino acid residues. This polypeptide chain is cross-linked by five disulfide bridges, categorizing the α-bungarotoxin as a type II α-neurotoxin within the three-finger toxin family. These disulfide bridges are formed between the specific cysteine residues and are important for the stability and function of the toxin. Furthermore, α-bungarotoxin contains ten residues of half-cysteine per molecule. The specific arrangements of disulfide bridges formed by these cysteine residues result in the 11-ring structure within the toxin molecule. This 11-ring structure is particularly essential for the toxin interactions with the target receptors and modulation of the neurotransmission at the neuromuscular junction.

The amino acid sequence of the α-bungarotoxin contains a high frequency of homodipeptides, with ten pairs present where serine and proline dipeptides occur twice in the sequence. The active site of the toxin is located in the region from position 24 to position 45 within the sequence. There are some key amino acids commonly found in this region that include cysteine, arginine, glycine, lysine and valine. As previously mentioned, cysteine is crucial for the disulfide bridges formation in proteins. Arginine and lysine can participate in interactions with negatively charged molecules or residues, so they may play a role in the binding to specific receptors or substrates. Glycine may contribute to the flexibility and conformational dynamics of the α-bungarotoxin. Lastly, the valine residue may help maintain the hydrophobic core of the toxin.

Similar to other α-neurotoxins within the three-finger toxin family, α-bungarotoxin exhibits a tertiary structure that is characterized by three projecting "finger" loops, a C-terminal tail, and a small globular core stabilized by four disulfide bonds. Notably, an additional disulfide bond is present in the second loop, facilitating a proper binding through the mobility of the tips of fingers I and II. Furthermore, hydrogen bonds contribute to the formation of an antiparallel β-sheet, maintaining the parallel orientation of the second and third loops. The structural integrity of the three-finger toxin is preserved by four of the disulfide bridges, while the fifth bridge, located on the tip of the second loop, can be reduced without compromising toxicity.

The α-bungarotoxin polypeptide chain shows significant sequence homology with other neurotoxins from cobra and sea snake venoms, particularly with the α-toxin from Naja nivea. Comparing α-bungarotoxin with these homologous toxins from cobra and sea snake venoms, it was revealed that there is a high degree of conservation in certain residues. For instance, there are 18 constant residues, which include the eight half-cysteines, that are observed in all toxin sequences. Therefore, α-bungarotoxin shares common structural motifs with other toxins of the three-fingered family. For example, α-cobra toxin, erabutoxin A, and candoxin contain three adjacent loops coming up from a globular, small and hydrophobic core that is cross-linked by four conserved disulfide bridges. This conservation suggests the presence of essential functional elements that are shared among these neurotoxins.

Lastly, the abundance of the disulfide bonds and the limited secondary structure that is observed in the α-bungarotoxin explains its exceptional stability, which makes it resistant to denaturation even under extreme conditions such as boiling and exposure to strong acids.

== Synthesis ==
=== Chemical synthesis ===
Due to its very large and complex structure, synthesizing α-bungarotoxin has represented a great challenge for synthetic chemists. [16] A study conducted by O. Brun et al. proposed a mechanism for the chemical synthesis of this neurotoxin. It involves a strategy utilizing peptide fragments and native chemical ligation (NCL). Due to its length, synthesizing a full linear peptide using solid-phase peptide synthesis (SPPS) is not achievable, thus, the synthesis was done by choosing three peptide fragments that can further undergo the native chemical ligation. This method produces a native peptide bond between two fragments by reacting thioester (C-terminal) with cysteine (N-terminal). The synthesis strategy employed was from the C-terminus towards the N-terminus. Firstly, the shorter peptide fragments are synthesized via automated SPPS. The first two peptides have a Trp-Cys ligation point, while the ligation with the last fragment occurs in a Gly-Cys ligation point. Additionally, in this study, an alkyne functionality was introduced at the N-terminus of the peptide chain. This allows the conjugation of different molecules such as fluorophores via bioorthogonal reactions. By fluorescently labelling the chemically synthesised peptide it was shown it has the same effect and functionality on the nicotinic receptors as the naturally occurring α-bungarotoxin.

=== Purification ===
Due to the challenging chemical synthesis of the neurotoxin, most studies were conducted using a purified form. To investigate the effects of the α-bungarotoxin, the toxin has to be isolated from the venom of the elapid snake. The purification of the polypeptide is done via column chromatography. Firstly, the venom is dissolved in ammonium acetate buffer and then loaded on the CM-Sephadex column. The elution of the compound is done in two different steps by using an ammonium acetate buffer at a flow rate of 35 nl/h. The steps involve using two linear gradients of buffers while increasing the pH.

=== Biosynthesis ===
α-Bungarotoxin is a peptide, therefore it undergoes the protein synthesis pathway, involving transcription and translation. The specific genes encoding for the protein are transcribed into mRNA, which is then translated via the ribosomes, leading to the synthesis of the prepropeptide. Lastly, post-translational modification and folding occur. The mature peptide is stored in the venom gland until envenomation when it gets released.

== Mechanism of action ==
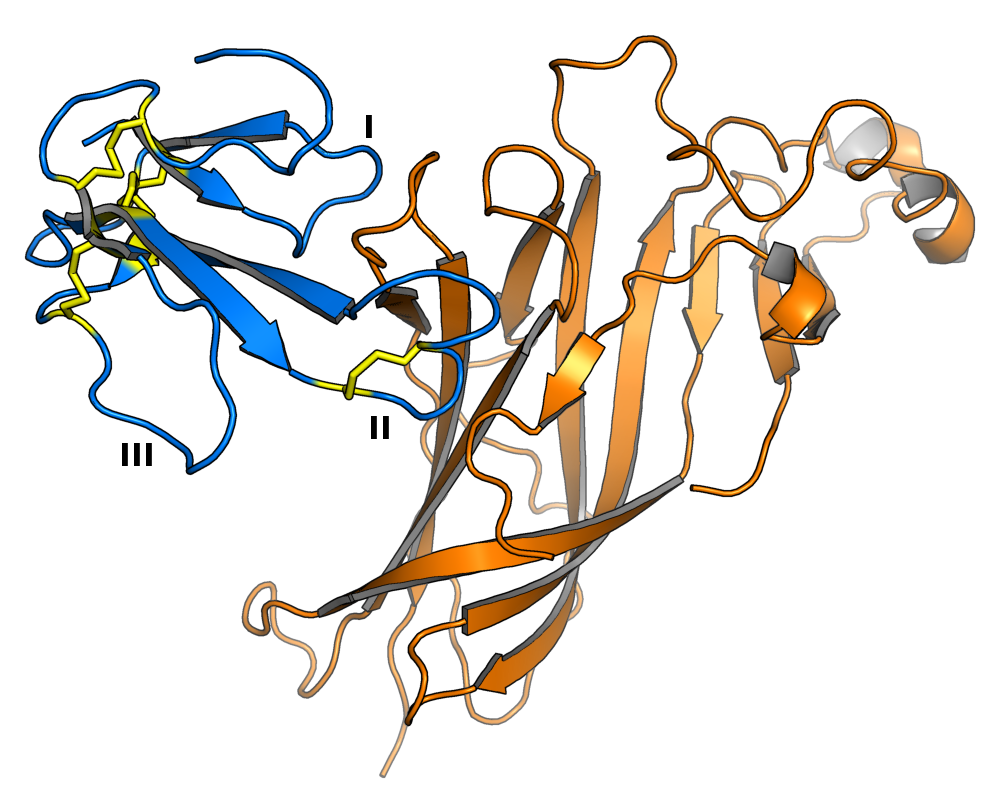
Structure of alpha-bungarotoxin (blue) in complex with the alpha-9 nAChR subunit (orange), showing interactions with loops I and II.

The venom of snakes contains numerous proteins and peptide toxins that exhibit high affinity and specificity for a larger range of receptors. α-Bungarotoxin is a nicotinic receptor antagonist that binds irreversibly to the receptor, inhibiting the action of acetylcholine at the neuromuscular junctions. Nicotinic receptors are one of the two subtypes of cholinergic receptors, that respond to the neurotransmitter acetylcholine.

Nicotinic acetylcholine receptors (nAChRs) are ligand-gated ion channels, being part of the ionotropic receptors. When a ligand is bound to it, it regulates excitability by controlling the ion flow during action potential during neurotransmission, primarily through the activation of voltage-gated ion channels upon depolarization of the plasma membrane. The depolarization is induced by an influx of cations, mainly that of sodium ions. For the overall modulation of cellular excitability, an influx of sodium ions and an efflux of potassium ions into the intracellular space is necessary.

In the central and peripheral nervous system, α-bungarotoxin acts by inducing paralysis in skeletal muscles by binding to a subtype of nicotinic receptors α7. α-Neurotoxins are known as "curare-mimetic toxins" due to their similar effects to the arrow poison tubocurarine. A difference between α-neurotoxins and curare alkaloids is that they bind irreversibly and reversibly specifically. α-Neurotoxins block the action of acetylcholine (ACh) at the postsynaptic membrane by irreversibly inhibiting the ion flow.

From the same toxin family of bungarotoxins, κ-BTX was shown to act postsynaptically on α3 and α4 neuronal nicotinic receptors with little effect on the muscular nAChRs, targeted by α-BTX. In contrast, β- and γ-BTX act presynaptically by reducing ACh release. Neurotoxins are named based on the receptor type they target.

The nicotinic receptors are made up of five subunits each and contain two binding sites for snake venom neurotoxins. The α7-nAChR is a homopentamer consisting of five identical α7 subunits. The α7 receptor is known to have a higher Ca^{2+} permeability compared to other nicotinic receptors. Changes in Ca^{2+} intracellularly can activate important cellular pathways such as the STAT pathway or the NF-κB signalling.

Consistency with experimental data on the amount of toxin per receptor is evident in the observation that a lone molecule of the toxin is adequate to inhibit channel opening. Some computational studies of the mechanism of inhibition using normal mode dynamics suggest that a twist-like motion caused by ACh binding may be responsible for pore opening and that this motion is inhibited by toxin binding.

== Metabolism ==
The following section describes the ADME (absorption, distribution, metabolism and excretion) of α-bungarotoxin. There is limited information available on the pharmacokinetics of this neurotoxin. More research is needed to be able to fully understand the metabolism of this neurotoxin inside the body.

Absorption: α-bungarotoxin enters the body after envenomation into the bloodstream at the bite site. Through the venom, a mixture of proteins and different molecules enter the body.

Distribution: Once in the bloodstream, α-bungarotoxin circulates throughout the body. Its distribution may be influenced by factors such as blood flow, tissue permeability, and the presence of binding proteins. Additionally, knowing it binds to nAChRs, it can be predicted where the neurotoxin would be present: neuromuscular junctions, autonomic ganglia, peripheral nerves, and adrenal medulla. One of the main locations would be also the central nervous system (CNS), including the brain. Specific regions such as the hippocampus, cortex, and basal ganglia contain these receptors.

Metabolism: The metabolic pathways of this neurotoxins have not been fully understood yet, however, it is thought to be metabolised in the liver. Researching venom metabolism is challenging due to the multiple components present in it. Toxins that are not bound may undergo elimination through opsonization by the reticuloendothelial system, mainly involving the liver and kidneys, or they may undergo degradation through cellular internalization facilitated by lysosomes.

Excretion: It is common for proteins and peptides to be excreted via the hepatic and renal pathways. In the liver, the amino acids present undergo transamination. This way the amino acids are converted into ammonia and keto acids. Lastly, these substances are excreted via the kidney.

However, it is important to take into account that α-bungarotoxin binds irreversibly to the receptors, which would result in a very low metabolic and excretion rate, as most of the neurotoxin would be present at the receptor sites.

== Indications, availability, efficacy, adverse effects ==
=== Indications ===
The α-bungarotoxin is among the most well-characterized snake toxins, with its high affinity and specificity for nicotinic acetylcholine receptors. It is a competitive antagonist at nAChR, where it irreversibly and competitively blocks the receptor at the acetylcholine binding sites. It binds to the α1 subunit contained in muscle nAChRs, as well as subsets of neuronal nAChRs like α7-α10. In addition, it was shown that α-bungarotoxin binds to, and block, a subset of GABA_{A} receptors where the β3 subunits connect with each other. With this knowledge in mind, researchers can use α-bungarotoxin as an experimental tool for studying the properties of cholinergic receptors.

In addition, by knowing the different and specific binding sites, researchers are able to visualize and track receptor localization and dynamics within cells. This technique has been shown to be easy with the use of a 13-amino acid (WRYYESSLEPYPD) mimotope, which forms a high affinity α-bungarotoxin binding site with the receptors.

It has been extensively used in research to study the localization and distribution of these receptors. Through techniques like fluorophore or enzyme conjugation followed by microscopy or immunohistochemical staining, respectively, could give insights about the complex organization and function of the nervous system. With the mentioned techniques, researchers can work towardards a drug development, and understand the disease mechanism. They can idenitify potential drug targets by selectively regulating the activity of certain receptors. Therefore, observe how receptors behave when in contact with the α-bungarotoxin compared to when there is no toxin, researchers can study the mechanism of the toxin.

=== Availability ===
α-Bungarotoxin is available for purchase from multiple biotechnological companies, such as Sigma-Aldrich or Biotium. Researchers may purchase it from there to perform a variety of researches on the toxin.

Regarding bioavailability, researchers performed a study in the spinal cord during embryonic development in the embryos of chicks. They found that that binding of α-bungarotoxin was specific and saturable within the concentration range of 1-34 mM. Meaning, as the concentration of α-bungarotoxin increased, the binding site became more and more limited. Reaching the maximum number at 34 mM. Once there was no binding sites available anymore, nicotine behaved in a competitive manner and pushed out the already-bound α-bungarotoxin. Another thing they found was that the dissociation constant (Kd) was 8.0 nM - a concentration of α-bungarotoxin where half of the binding site were occupied. Moreover, maximum binding capacity (Bmax) was found to be 106 +/- 12 fmol/mg - the maximum number of binding sites available per unit of protein. Finally, exogenously administered α-bungarotoxin showed to penetrate the spinal cord tissue and bind to its specific sites after 7 days.

=== Efficacy ===
The efficacy of α-bungarotoxin can be assessed by analyzing their binding affinity. It affects how the signal transmits at the skeletal neuromuscular junction by binding to the postsynaptic nAChRs at high affinity. The affinity of the toxin for this receptor is measured with a dissociation constant (Kd), ranging from 10-11 to 10-9 M. In addition to binding to skeletal neuromuscular junctions, it can specifically bind to different neuronal subsets, such as α7. This binding affinity is only slightly lower with Kd measured in the range of 10-9 to 10-8 M.

It can also be analyzed through receptor inhibition, specifically inhibiting the action of acetylcholine on nAChRs. One study found that 5 mirograms/ml of the toxin completely blocks the endplate potential and extrajunctional acetylcholine sensitivity of surface fibers, within approximately 35 minutes in normal and chronically denervated muscles. They performed a washout period of 6.5 hours, which resulted in a partial recovery of the endplate potential, with an amplitude of 0.72 +/- 0.033 mV in normal muscles. In denervated muscles, a partial recovery of acetylcholine sensitivity was observed, with an amplitude of 41.02 +/- 3.95 mV/nC compared to a control amplitude of 1215 +/- 197 mV/nC. This same study also found a small population of acetylhcoline receptors (1% of the total population) to react with α-bungarotoxin reversibly. With the toxin, either 20 μM carbamylcholine or decamethonium was used simultaneously in normal muscles. Once the toxin and the drug were washed out, the muscle restored a twitch to control levels within 2 hours.

The susceptibility of different species to the venom of a krait snake, which contains alpha-bungarotoxin, varies based on their genetic makeup. α-Bungarotoxin binds best to the acetylcholine alpha-subunit containing aromatic amino acid residues at positions 187 and 189 - e.g. shrews, cats and mice. In species like humans and hedgehogs, which have nonaromatic amino acid residues at the same positions, have a decreased binding affinity of α-bungarotoxin. Finally, snakes and mongooses have specific amino acid substitutions at 187, 189, and 194, alpha-subunits, which makes the binding of the toxin non-existent.

=== Adverse effects ===
In humans, exposure to α-bungarotoxin can lead to various symptoms, such as headache, dizziness, unconsciousness, visual and speech disturbances, and occasionally seizures. Onset of severe abdominal pain and muscular paralysis within 10 hours and may last for 4 days. Finally, respiratory paralysis can lead to death.

In animals, studies have been done to analyze the effect of the α-bungarotoxin on animals. One study showed this toxin causing paralysis in chickens by blocking neuromuscular transmission at the motor end-plate. This led to muscle weakness and ultimately, paralysis.

In ancient days, these venoms were already widespread across the world. Then, folklore medicine utilized plant-based and bioactive inhibitor compounds to treat bites from venomous animals like snakes and scorpions. This approach proved successful in preventing envenomation, effectively mitigating the harmful effects of venom on the victims. Today, treatment for krait bites involves antivenom, which can lead to various undesirable and potentially life-threatening side effects, such as nausea, urticarial, hypotension, cyanosis, and severe allergic reactions.

== Toxicity ==
α-Bungarotoxin belongs to a group of bungarotoxins, which are a type of poisonous proteins found in the venom of kraits - among the six most deadly snakes in Asia. Their bite can lead to respiratory paralysis and death. α-Bungarotoxin irreversibly and competitively binds to muscular and neuronal acetylcholine receptors. The paralysis happens due to the neuromuscular transmission at the postsynaptic site being blocked.

LD_{50} values, representing lethal dose required to cause death in 50%, were studied in mice using different routes of administration. Subcutaneous administration showed that 0.108 mg/kg was needed to kill 50% of mice. Intravenous administration resulted in a slightly higher LD_{50} value of 0.113 mg/kg. However, when it was administered intraperitoneally, the LD_{50} value was 0.08 mg/kg. These values can aid in risk assessment of the toxin.

== See also ==
- β-Bungarotoxin
- κ-Bungarotoxin
