= Irditoxin =

Irditoxin subunit A

Identifiers
- Organism: Boiga irregularis
- Symbol: 3NBA
- PDB: 2H7Z
- UniProt: A0S864
Search for
- Structures: Swiss-model
- Domains: InterPro

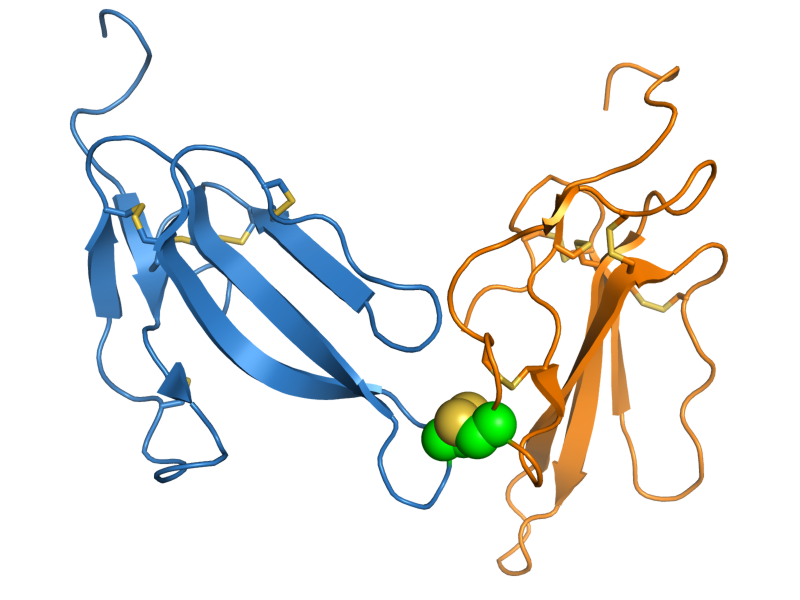
Structure of irditoxin, with subunit A in blue and subunit B in orange. In each subunit, intramolecular disulfide bonds are shown as yellow sticks. The intramolecular disulfide bond at the dimer interface is shown as green and yellow spheres.

Irdixotin subunit B

Identifiers
- Organism: Boiga irregularis
- Symbol: 3NBB
- PDB: 2H7Z
- UniProt: A0S865
Search for
- Structures: Swiss-model
- Domains: InterPro

Irditoxin is a three-finger toxin (3FTx) protein found in the venom of the brown tree snake (Boiga irregularis) and likely in other members of the genus Boiga. It is a heterodimer composed of two distinct protein chains, each of the three-finger protein fold, linked by an intermolecular disulfide bond. This structure is unusual for 3FTx proteins, which are most commonly monomeric.

== Structure ==
Three-finger toxin (3FTx) proteins canonically consist of approximately 60-80 amino acid residues that assume a structure with three "finger"-like beta strand-containing loops projecting from a core stabilized by four intramolecular disulfide bonds. Irditoxin is a covalent heterodimer in which two subunits are linked by an intermolecular disulfide bond. Each subunit is of the three-finger toxin (3FTx) protein superfamily and is most closely related to the "non-conventional" 3FTx subclass, characterized by the presence of an additional disulfide bond in the first of the canonical three "finger" loops. Each subunit thus contains 11 cysteine residues: the eight canonical residues that form the core disulfide bonds, the two in the first loop forming the non-conventional disulfide, and the one that forms the dimeric linkage. Irditoxin subunits A and B are 75 and 77 amino acid residues long, respectively, and each possess a seven-residue extension with a pyroglutamic acid post-translational modification at the N-terminus.

Irditoxin's structure is highly unusual within the 3FTx superfamily. Most 3FTx proteins are monomers. The best-studied exception is kappa-bungarotoxin, a non-covalent homodimer with a very different protein-protein interaction surface; the recently described alpha-cobratoxin also forms both covalent homodimers and low-abundance covalent heterodimers with other 3FTx proteins found in monocled cobra (Naja kaouthia) venom. It is as yet unclear how irditoxin's two subunits contribute to its biological activities.

== Function ==
Irditoxin is an abundant protein in the venom of the brown tree snake and accounts for about 10% of the protein found in venom samples of brown treesnakes collected from Guam, where they are an invasive species. Irditoxin's toxic effects are highly species-dependent; in laboratory tests, it is highly toxic to lizards and birds but not to mammals. Although the molecular mechanism of toxicity is not clear, irditoxin produces robust post-synaptic blockade of signaling in the avian neuromuscular junction.

== Discovery and nomenclature ==
Irditoxin was first described in 2009 after isolation from samples of venom from the brown tree snake. Its name is a contraction of "B. irregularis dimeric toxin". Other Boiga species, and possibly other colubrid snakes, likely possess homologous proteins.
