= Bungarotoxin =

Class of neurotoxic proteins

Bungarotoxins are toxins found in the venom of snakes and kraits. Bites from these animals can result in severe symptoms including bleeding or hemorrhage, paralysis and tissue damage that can result in amputation. The paralytic effects of venom are particularly dangerous as they can impair breathing. These symptoms are the result of bungarotoxin presence in the venom. In actuality, venom contains several distinct bungarotoxins, each varying in which receptors they act on and how powerful they are.

== History ==
Bungarotoxins are a group of closely related neurotoxic proteins of the three-finger toxin superfamily found in the venom of kraits including Bungarus multicinctus (the many-banded krait). These toxins alter neurotransmission to yield powerful paralytic effects on skeletal muscle. Venom of the many-banded krait began to be studied by Chuan-Chiung Chang and Chen-Yuan Lee of the National Taiwan University in the 1950s; however, it was not until 1963 that its components were separated and isolated. They discovered that this venom consisted of a mixture of individual toxins that act at different sites and receptors to modulate neurotransmission. Through electrophoresis the venom was found to be composed of five distinct toxins, one of which remain unnamed.

The four characterized toxins are:

- α-Bungarotoxin
- β-Bungarotoxin (not a three-finger toxin)
- γ-Bungarotoxin (Q9YGJ0)
- k-Bungarotoxin

== Snake bites ==
Research involving bungarotoxins has been significant in improving our understanding of neurotransmission. Additionally, snake and krait bites and envenomation cause significant morbidity; understanding the mechanism by which bungarotoxins work can improve treatment options in such situations. According to the World Health Organization, approximately 5.4 million people are bitten by snakes each year with 2.7 million people becoming envenomed. Majority of these cases occur in Africa, Asia and Latin America and outcomes can be debilitating if not treated immediately. Symptoms of envenomation include shortness of breath, weakness or paralysis, difficulty swallowing and skin damage at the bite site. Symptoms can be worse or progress faster in children, and in severe cases can result in limb amputations, prolonged paralysis, permanent deficits or death. While treatment includes administration of anticholinergics and anti-venom, anti-venom is costly and is not readily available, particularly to the populations that require it most. When patients are treated with anticholinergics and anti-venom, often there is delayed recovery of paralysis. This has been attributed to the β-BTX component of the venom which makes up 20% of the venom and is the most potent of the toxins.

== Toxin mechanism ==
Bungarotoxins function by modulating acetylcholine neurotransmission in both muscles and neurons. α-Bungarotoxin irreversibly blocks the binding of acetylcholine (ACh) to postsynaptic nicotinic acetylcholine receptors (nAchR) on both muscle and neurons. In addition to being found in the venom of kraits, it is also in venoms of the elapids and sea snakes. Similarly, κ-bungarotoxin acts to block postsynaptic nAchRs, but its effect is primarily on neuronal receptors rather than muscular nicotinic receptors. Conversely, β- and γ-bungarotoxins act presynaptically to reduce acetylcholine (ACh) release.

== Structure ==
The three-finger protein family is a family of proteins that share similar 3-dimensional structure. They are found in a wide variety of organisms including snakes. In snakes and kraits, venomous toxins largely consist of those with a three-finger structure. The structure of the α-BTX has been most studied; its three-finger structure consists of a hydrophobic globular core from which 3 beta-pleated-sheet loops extend as well as a C-terminus. Within the family of three-finger α-neurotoxins, the protein structure is further subcategorized as short chain, long chain, atypical long chain and non conventional α-neurotoxins. This subclassification describes additional structural aspects of the toxin as well as the receptors they act on. For example, α-BTX is a long chain toxin meaning it is composed of 66-70 amino acids and possesses a three-finger structure. Long chain toxins act on nAchR in both muscle and neurons whereas short chain α-neurotoxins act on nAchR in muscle only. While all α-neurotoxins of the three-finger family will act on muscle nAchR, these differences in structure determine selectivity of the toxin for its receptor as well as affinity and dissociation.
