= Three-finger toxin =

Toxin protein

Snake toxin and toxin-like protein
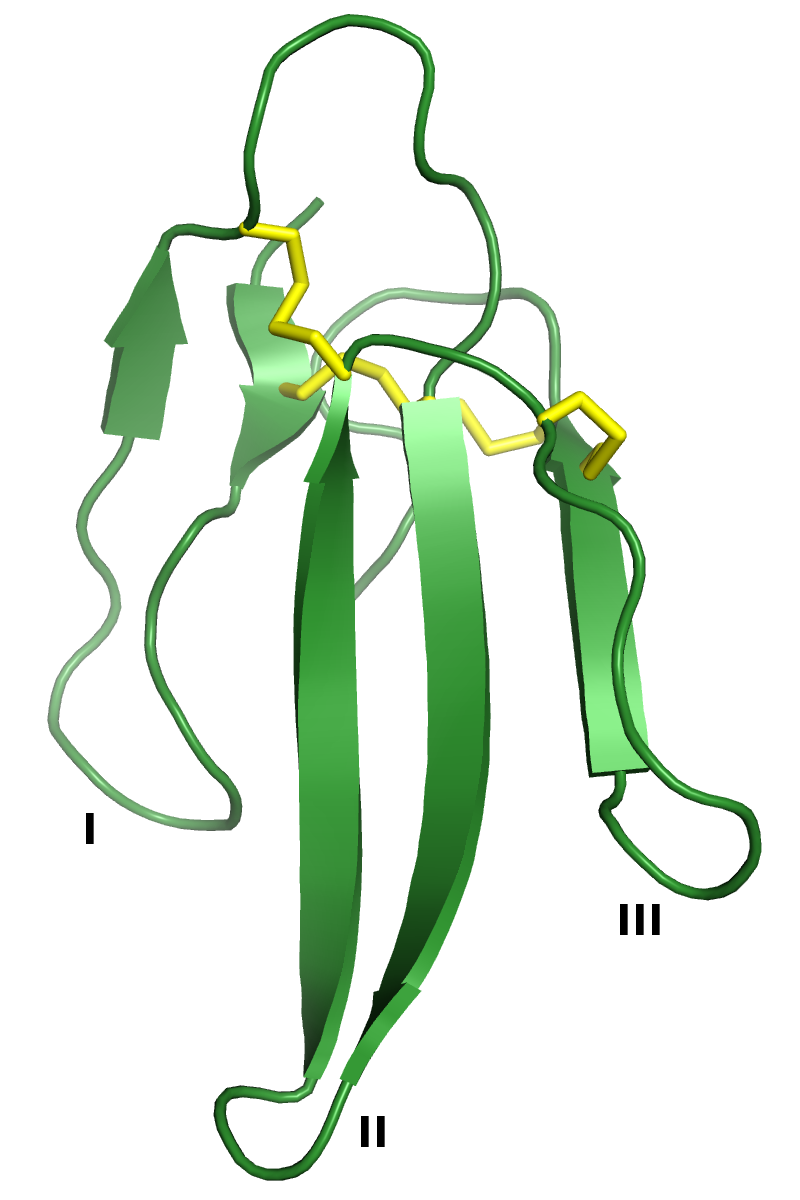
- Erabutoxin A, a neurotoxin that is a member of the 3FTx superfamily. The three "fingers" are labeled I, II, and III, and the four conserved disulfide bonds are shown in yellow. Rendered from PDB: 1QKD.

Identifiers
- Symbol: Toxin_TOLIP
- Pfam: PF00087
- Pfam clan: CL0117
- InterPro: IPR003571
- PROSITE: PS00272
- CATH: 1qkd
- SCOP2: 1qkd / SCOPe / SUPFAM
- OPM superfamily: 53
- OPM protein: 1txa
- CDD: cd00206
Available protein structures:
- PDB: IPR003571 PF00087 (ECOD; PDBsum)
- AlphaFold: IPR003571; PF00087

Three-finger toxins (abbreviated 3FTx) are a protein superfamily of small toxin proteins found in the venom of snakes. Three-finger toxins are in turn members of a larger superfamily of three-finger protein domains, which includes non-toxic proteins that share a similar protein fold. The group is named for its common structure consisting of three beta strand loops connected to a central core containing four conserved disulfide bonds. The 3FP protein domain has no enzymatic activity and is typically between 60 and 74 amino acid residues long. Despite their conserved structure, three-finger toxin proteins have a wide range of pharmacological effects. Most members of the family are neurotoxins that act on cholinergic intercellular signaling; the alpha-neurotoxin family interacts with muscle nicotinic acetylcholine receptors (nAChRs), the kappa-bungarotoxin family with neuronal nAChRs, and muscarinic toxins with muscarinic acetylcholine receptors (mAChRs).

== Structure ==
The three-finger toxin superfamily is defined by a common tertiary structure consisting of three beta strand-containing loops (designated loops I, II, and III) projecting from a small hydrophobic core containing four conserved disulfide bonds. This structure is thought to resemble a hand with three fingers, giving rise to the name. The proteins are typically 60-74 amino acid residues long, though some have additional N- or C-terminal extensions. An additional disulfide bond may be present in either loop I or loop II. The superfamily can be broadly divided into three classes:

- short-chain toxins have under 66 residues and four core disulfide bonds.
- long-chain toxins have at least 66 residues, a disulfide bond in loop II, and possibly a C-terminal extension.
- non-conventional toxins have a disulfide bond in loop I and possibly terminal extensions.

=== Oligomerization ===
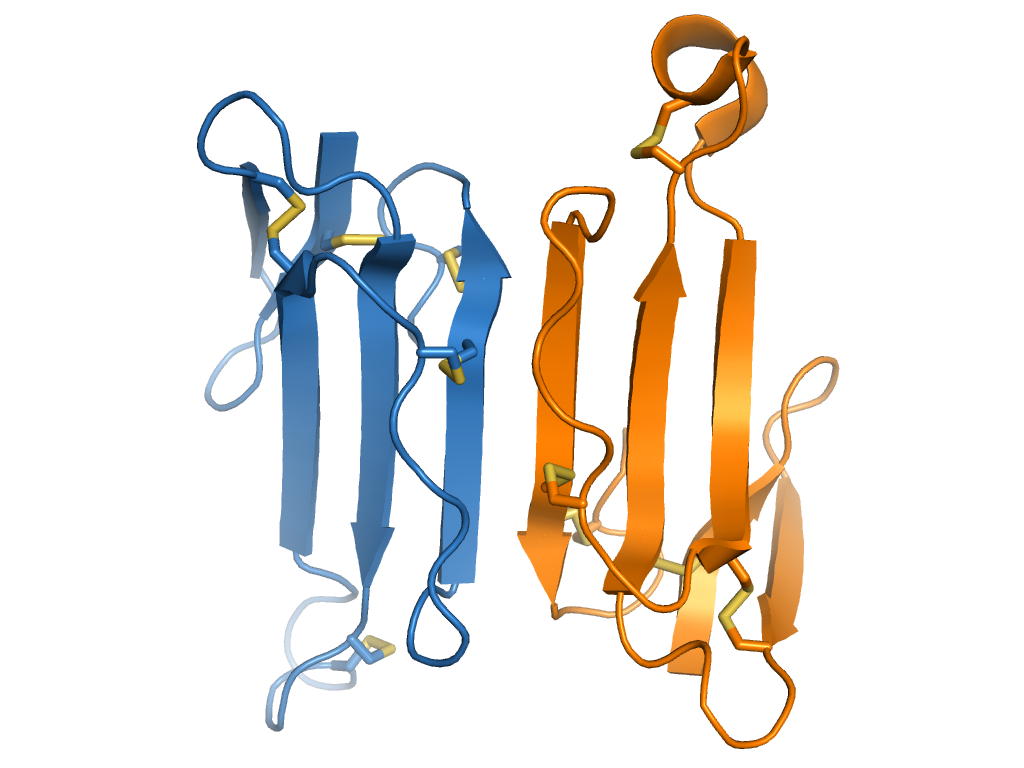
Kappa-bungarotoxin, a 3FTx protein whose functional state is a non-covalent homodimer

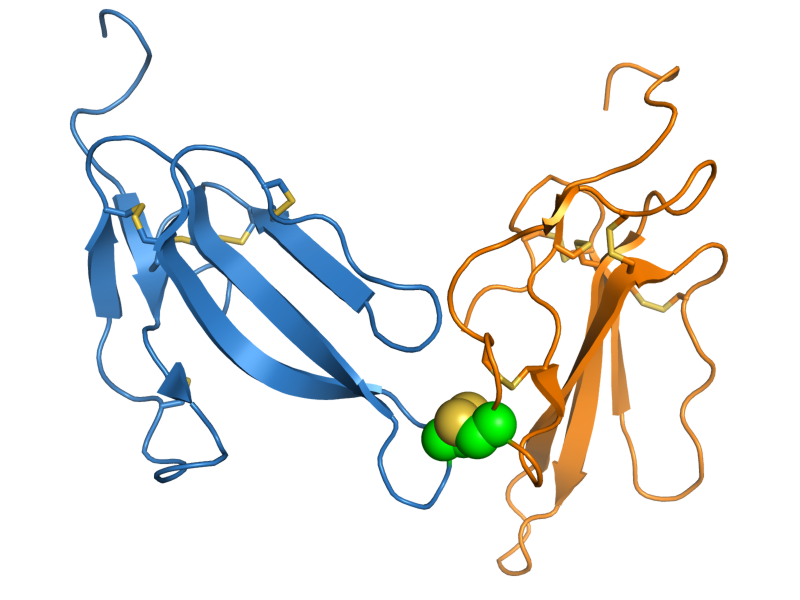
Irditoxin, whose functional state is a covalent heterodimer; the inter-subunit disulfide bond is shown with green spheres

Most 3FTx proteins are monomers. However, some 3FTx subgroups form functional non-covalent homodimers. The kappa-bungarotoxin group is the best characterized dimeric 3FTx, and interacts through an antiparallel dimer interface composed of the outer strand of loop III. Haditoxin is another example of a dimeric 3FTx; it is a member of the short-chain group and has a similar dimer interface but distinct pharmacology compared to the long-chain-like kappa-bungarotoxins.

A few examples of covalently linked dimers have also been described. These proteins, from the non-conventional group, are linked through intermolecular disulfide bonds. Some, such as irditoxin, are heterodimers linked by cysteines in loops I and II. Others, such as α-cobratoxin, can form both homodimers and heterodimers which have distinct pharmacological activities in vitro, though their functional significance is unclear due to their very low concentration in venom.

== Function ==
Despite their conserved shared structure, 3FTx proteins have a wide range of pharmacological effects mediating their toxicity. Many members of the family are neurotoxins that bind to receptor proteins in the cell membrane, particularly nicotinic acetylcholine receptors. Others, including the second-largest 3FTx subgroup, are cardiotoxins.

=== Cellular targets ===
==== Nicotinic acetylcholine receptors ====
Many of the most well-characterized 3FTx proteins exert their toxic effects through binding to nicotinic acetylcholine receptors (nAChRs), a family of ligand-gated ion channels. 3FTx binding interferes with cholinergic intercellular signaling particularly at neuromuscular junctions and causes paralysis. The alpha-neurotoxin family is a group of 3FTx proteins that bind muscle nAChRs, preventing the binding of the neurotransmitter acetylcholine. Alpha-bungarotoxin, the alpha-neurotoxin from the many-banded krait (Bungarus multicinctus), has a long history of use in molecular biology research; it was through the study of this toxin that nAChRs were isolated and characterized, which facilitated the study of the subunit composition of tissue-specific nAChRs and the detailed pharmacological understanding of the neuromuscular junction. In general, short-chain 3FTx members of this group bind muscle nAChRs only, and long-chain members bind both muscle and neuronal receptors. This 3FTx group is sometimes referred to as the "curaremimetic" toxins due to the similarity of their effects with the plant alkaloid curare.

Other groups of 3FTx proteins also bind to different nAChR subtypes; for example, kappa-neurotoxins, which are long-chain dimers, bind neuronal nAChRs, and haditoxin, which is a short-chain dimer, binds both muscle and neuronal subtypes. Non-conventional 3FTx proteins also often bind nAChRs; these were thought to be weaker toxins when first discovered, but the class has been found to possess a range of binding affinities. Recently, a new class of nAChR antagonist 3FTx proteins called omega-neurotoxins has been described.

==== Muscarinic acetylcholine receptors ====
A smaller class of 3FTx proteins binds instead to muscarinic acetylcholine receptors, a family of G-protein-coupled receptors. Muscarinic toxins can be either receptor agonists or receptor antagonists, and in some cases the same 3FTx protein is an agonist at one receptor subtype and an antagonist at another. Muscarinic toxins are generally of the short-chain type.

==== Acetylcholinesterase ====
A class of 3FTx proteins called fasciculins bind the enzyme acetylcholinesterase and inhibit its activity by blocking access of acetylcholine to the enzyme's active site, thereby preventing acetylcholine breakdown. This class derives its name from its clinical effect, causing muscle fasciculations.

==== Cardiac targets ====
The second-largest class of 3FTx proteins causes toxicity in cardiac myocytes and can cause increased heart rate and eventually cardiac arrest. These cardiotoxins also often have generalized cytotoxic effects and are sometimes known as cytolysins. The protein targets in myocytes are not generally known for this class, though some members may cause physical damage to the cell by establishing pores in the cell membrane.

Another class, called the beta-cardiotoxins, causes decreased heart rate and are thought to function as beta blockers, antagonists for the beta-1 and beta-2 adrenergic receptors.

==== Less common targets ====
There are known 3FTx proteins that target a variety of additional protein targets to exert their toxic effects. For example, L-type calcium channels are targeted by calciseptine and platelet aggregation is inhibited via interactions with adhesion proteins by dendroaspin and related proteins. In some cases no toxicity is observed as a result of the 3FTx-target interaction; for example, the mambalgin family of 3FTx proteins interacts with acid-sensing ion channels to produce analgesia without apparent toxic effect in laboratory tests.

==== Orphan 3FTx proteins ====
Bioinformatics-based surveys of known protein sequences have often identified a number of sequences likely to form a 3FTx protein structure but whose function has not been experimentally characterized. Thus, it is not known whether these "orphan" proteins are in fact toxins or what their cellular targets might be. Genomics studies of gene expression in snakes have shown that members of protein families traditionally considered toxins are widely expressed in snake body tissues and that this expression pattern occurs outside the highly venomous superfamily Caenophidia.

=== Structure-function activity relationships ===
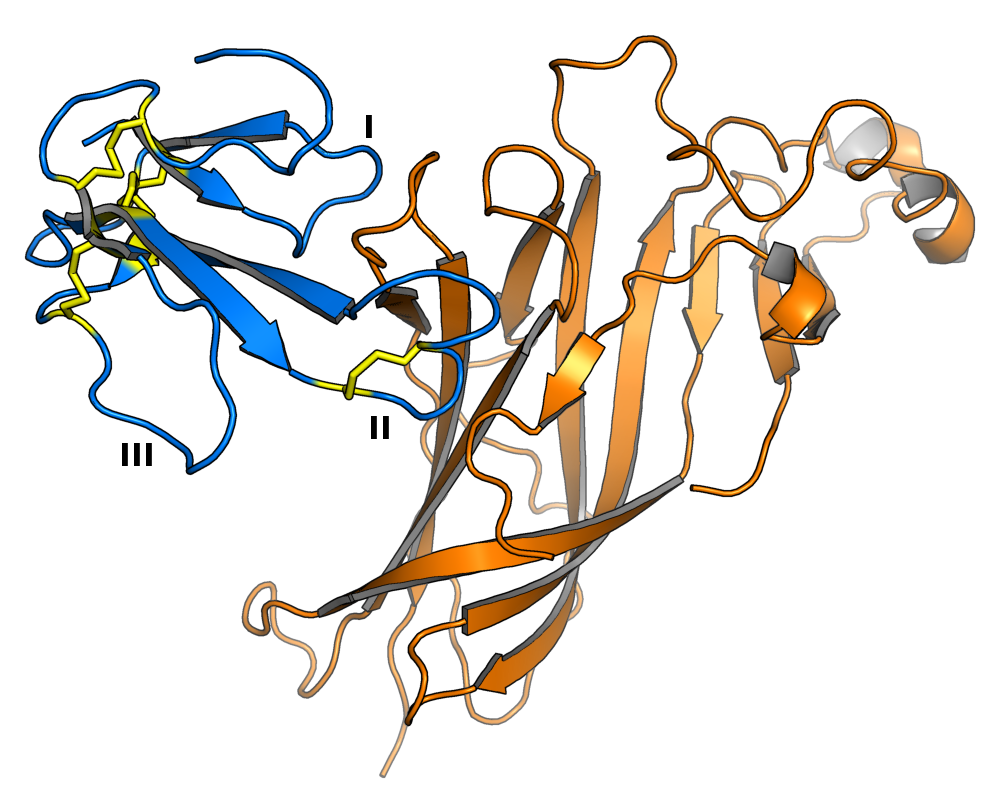
Structure of alpha-bungarotoxin (blue) in complex with the alpha-9 nAChR subunit (orange), showing interactions with loops I and II

Because 3FTx proteins of similar structure bind a diverse range of cellular protein targets, the relationships between 3FTx protein sequence and their biological activity have been studied extensively, especially among the alpha-neurotoxins. Known functional sites conferring binding affinity and specificity are concentrated in the loops of 3FTx proteins. For example, the crystal structure of alpha-bungarotoxin in complex with the extracellular domain of the alpha-9 nAChR subunit indicates a protein-protein interaction mediated through loops I and II, with no contacts formed by loop III. Interaction surfaces have been mapped for a number of toxins and vary in which loops participate in binding; erabutoxin A uses all three loops to bind nAChRs, while the dendroaspin interaction with adhesion proteins is mediated by three residues in loop III. In some 3FTx proteins with a C-terminal extension, these residues also participate in forming key binding interactions.

The cardiotoxin/cytolysin 3FTx subgroup has a somewhat different set of functionally significant residues due to its distinct mechanism of action, likely involving interactions with phospholipids in the cell membrane, as well as possible functionally significant interactions with other cell-surface molecules such as glycosaminoglycans. A hydrophobic patch of residues contiguous in tertiary structure but distributed over all three loops has been identified as functionally significant in combination with a set of conserved lysine residues conferring local positive charge.

Because of their structural similarity and functional diversity, 3FTx proteins have been used as model systems for the study of protein engineering. Their high binding specificity against targets of pharmacological interest, lack of enzymatic activity, and low immunogenicity have also prompted interest in their potential as drug leads.

== Evolution ==
Although three-finger proteins in general are widely distributed among metazoans, three-finger toxins appear only in snakes. They are usually considered to be restricted to the Caenophidia lineage (the taxon containing all venomous snakes), though at least one putative 3FTx homolog has been identified in the genome of the Burmese python, a member of a sister taxon. Early work in analyzing protein homology by sequence alignment in the 1970s suggested 3FTx proteins may have evolved from an ancestral ribonuclease; however, more recent molecular phylogeny studies indicate that 3FTx proteins evolved from non-toxic three-finger proteins.

Among venomous snakes, the distribution of 3FTx proteins varies; they are particularly enriched in venom from the family Elapidae. In the king cobra (Ophiophagus hannah) and Eastern green mamba (Dendroaspis angusticeps), 3FTx proteins make up about 70% of the protein toxins in venom; in the desert coral snake (Micrurus tschudii) the proportion is reported as high as 95%.

Genes encoding three-finger toxins are thought to have evolved through gene duplication. Traditionally, this has been conceptualized as repeated events of duplication followed by neofunctionalization and recruitment to gene expression patterns restricted to venom glands. However, it has been argued that this process should be extremely rare and that subfunctionalization better explains the observed distribution. More recently, non-toxic 3FP proteins have been found to be widely expressed in many different tissues in snakes, prompting the alternative hypothesis that proteins of restricted expression in saliva were selectively recruited for toxic functionality. There is evidence that most types of 3FTx proteins have been subject to positive selection (that is, diversifying selection) in their recent evolutionary history, possibly due to an evolutionary arms race with prey species. Notable exceptions are the dimeric kappa-bungarotoxin family, likely as a result of evolutionary constraints on the dimer interface, and the cardiotoxin/cytotoxin family, in which a larger fraction of the protein's residues are believed to have functional roles.
