= Journal of Biomedical Science =

- Discipline: Biomedicine
- Language: English
- Edited by: Chang Wen-chang

Publication details
- History: 1994-present
- Publisher: BioMed Central
- Frequency: Upon acceptance
- Open access: Yes
- License: Creative Commons Attribution License 4.0
- Impact factor: 12.771 (2021)

Standard abbreviations
- ISO 4: J. Biomed. Sci.

Indexing
- CODEN: JBCIEA
- ISSN: 1021-7770 (print); 1423-0127 (web)
- LCCN: sn94038251
- OCLC no.: 474776046

Links
- Journal homepage; Online access; Online archive

The Journal of Biomedical Science is a peer-reviewed medical journal that covers all aspects of basic medical sciences. It was established in 1994 by Chang Chuan-chiung and initially published by Springer Science+Business Media. Since 2009 it has been published by BioMed Central, after which it became open access. Originally the journal was published quarterly, before changing its frequency to bimonthly in 1996. The editor-in-chief is Chang Wen-chang (Taipei Medical University).

The journal was the first international journal in biomedical science to be operated by a Taiwanese team.

== Abstracting and indexing ==
The journal is abstracted and indexed in:

- Biological Abstracts
- BIOSIS
- Current Contents
- Embase
- EMBiology
- Global Health
- MEDLINE/PubMed
- Science Citation Index
- Scopus

According to the Journal Citation Reports, the journal has a 2020 impact factor of 8.410.
