= Chang Wen-chang =

Taiwanese pharmacologist (born 1947)

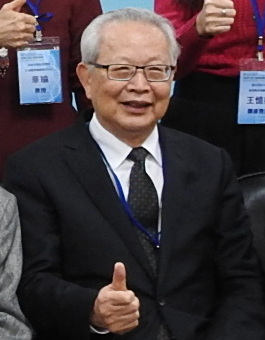
Image of Chang Wen-chang

Chang Wen-chang (Chinese: 張文昌; born 28 November 1947) is a Taiwanese pharmacologist.

== Education ==
Chang earned his Bachelor of Science degree from Taipei Medical University's Department of Pharmacy in 1969, and subsequently completed his master's of science and doctorate, both in pharmaceutical science, at the University of Tokyo in 1973 and 1976, respectively. After completing his education, Chang was a visiting fellow at the National Institute on Aging in the United States until 1978, served as a visiting scientist at the Tokyo Metropolitan Institutes of Gerontology until 1981, and subsequently worked as a visiting research fellow at the University of Kentucky.

== Career ==
Chang returned to Taiwan to join the National Cheng Kung University faculty in 1983, and remained on the NCKU staff until 2011. During his tenure at NCKU, Chang chaired the Department of Pharmacology until 1990 and led the Institute of Basic Medical Sciences between 1994 and 1999. Administratively, Chang was associate dean of NCKU's medical college from 1998 to 1999, and dean of the College of Bioscience and Biotechnology from 2005 to 2008. Between 2008 and 2011, Chang was a deputy minister of the National Science Council. As vice minister, Chang opined that Taiwanese students should be testing on English proficiency in the college entrance examination. From 2011, Chang served as chief editor of the Journal of Biomedical Science. In 2011, Chang moved to a chair professorship at Taipei Medical University's Graduate Institute of Medical Sciences. While on the TMU faculty, Chang held also held professorships within the International Master/Ph.D. Program in Medicine and Cell Therapy and Regeneration Medicine, and was chairman of the board of trustees between 2014 and 2022. Chang has served as a board member of Scinopharm Taiwan, Pharmosa Biopharm, and Universal Cement Corporation.

Chang has chaired the Tang Prize Selection Committee for Biopharmaceutical Science.

== Honors ==
In 2004, Chang was elected a member of Academia Sinica.
