= Α-Neurotoxin =

Group of neurotoxic peptides from snake venom

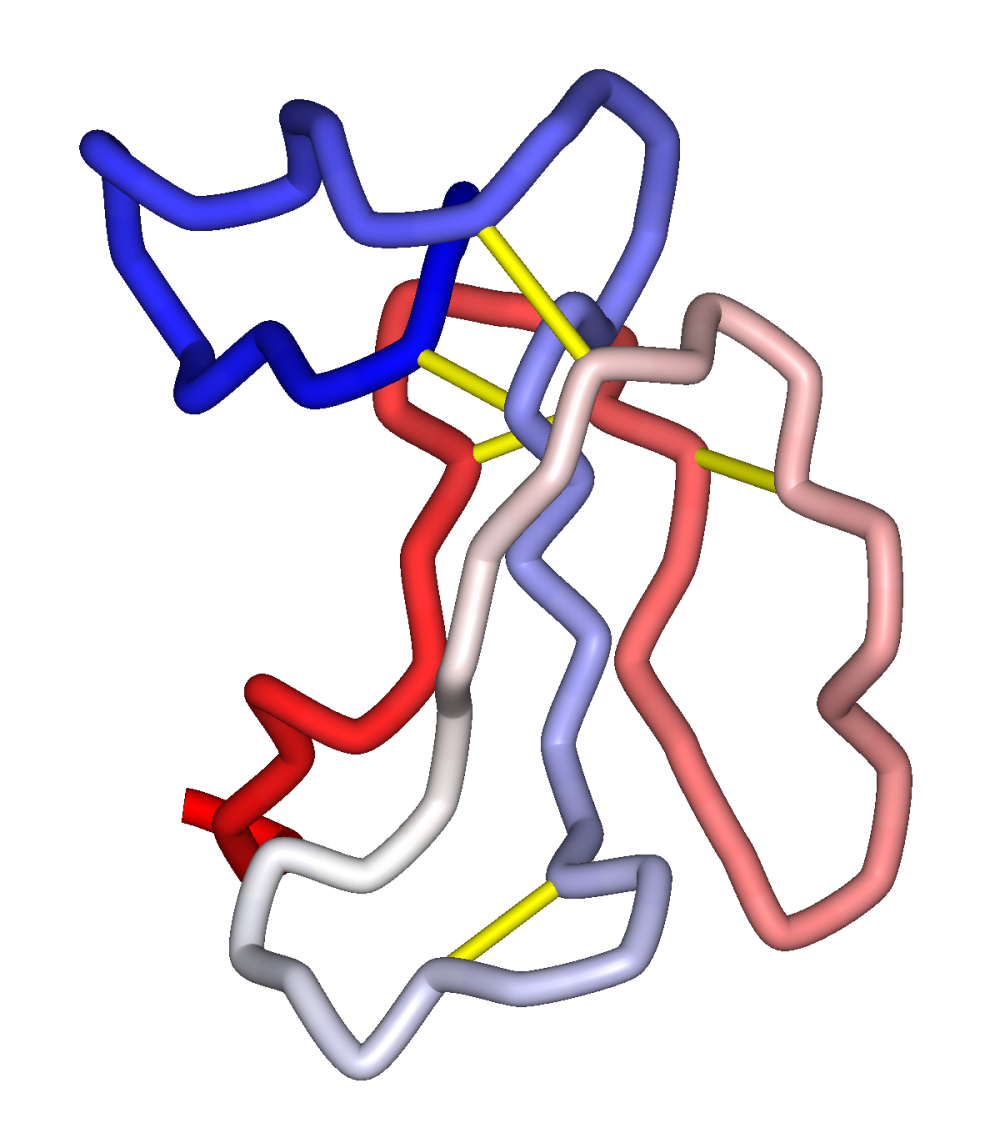
The three-dimensional structure of alpha-bungarotoxin, an alpha-neurotoxin from the venom of Bungarus multicinctus. Gold links indicate disulfide bonds. From PDB: 1IDI.

α-Neurotoxins are a group of neurotoxic peptides found in the venom of snakes in the families Elapidae and Hydrophiidae. They can cause paralysis, respiratory failure, and death. Members of the three-finger toxin protein family, they are antagonists of post-synaptic nicotinic acetylcholine receptors (nAChRs) in the neuromuscular synapse that bind competitively and irreversibly, preventing synaptic acetylcholine (ACh) from opening the ion channel. Over 100 α-neurotoxins have been identified and sequenced.

== History ==
The term α-neurotoxin was coined by C.C. Chang, who designated the postsynaptic bungarotoxin with the α- prefix because it happened to be slowest moving of the bungarotoxins under starch zone electrophoresis. The "α-" prefix subsequently came to connote any toxins with postsynaptic action. Members of this group are sometimes referred to as "curaremimetics" due to the similarity of their effects with the plant alkaloid curare.

As more snake venoms were characterized, many were found to contain homologous nAChR-antagonist proteins. These came to be collectively known as the snake venom α-neurotoxins.

== General structure ==
All α-neurotoxins share the three-finger toxin tertiary structure, consisting of a small globular core containing four disulfide bonds, three loops or "fingers", and a C-terminal tail. The class can be divided into two groups distinguished by length; short-chain neurotoxins have 60-62 residues and only the four core disulfide bonds characteristic of the fold, while long-chain neurotoxins have 66 or more residues, often including a longer C-terminus, and an additional disulfide bond in the second "finger" loop. These classes have significant sequence homology and share the same three-dimensional structure, but have differing specificities and kinetics of association/dissociation with the receptor. Localized mobility at the tips of fingers I and II is essential for binding. Accordingly, mutation of these residues produces large effects on binding. The additional disulfide bond in the second loop of the long-chain forms is likewise thought to influence binding specificity. Although both short and long-chain neurotoxins bind the same site on their target receptors, short-chain neurotoxins do not potently block α7 homo-oligomeric neuronal AChRs, while long-chain neurotoxins do. α-bungarotoxin and α-cobratoxin are both long-type.

== Functions ==
For specifics, see α-Bungarotoxin and nicotinic acetylcholine receptor

α-Neurotoxins antagonistically bind tightly and noncovalently to nAChRs of skeletal muscles, thereby blocking the action of ACh at the postsynaptic membrane, inhibiting ion flow and leading to paralysis. nAChRs contain two binding sites for snake venom neurotoxins. Some computational studies of the mechanism of inhibition using normal mode dynamics suggest that a twist-like motion caused by ACh binding may be responsible for pore opening, and that this motion is inhibited by toxin binding.

== Evolution ==
Although three-finger protein domains are widespread, three-finger toxins appear only in snakes, and are particularly enriched in elapids. There is evidence that alpha-neurotoxins have evolved rapidly and are subject to positive selection, possibly due to an evolutionary arms race with prey species.

Snake nAchRs have specific sequence features that render them poor binding partners for alpha-neurotoxins. Some mammalian lineages also display mutations conferring resistance to alpha-neurotoxins; such resistance is believed to have evolved convergently at least four times in mammals, reflecting two different biochemical mechanisms of adaptation. The introduction of glycosylation sites on the receptor, resulting in steric hindrance at the neurotoxin binding site, is a well-characterized resistance mechanism found in mongooses, while the honey badger, domestic pig, and hedgehog lineages replace aromatic amino acids with charged residues; at least in some lineages, these molecular adaptations likely reflect predation on venomous snakes.
