= Β-Bungarotoxin =

Chemical compound

β-Bungarotoxin
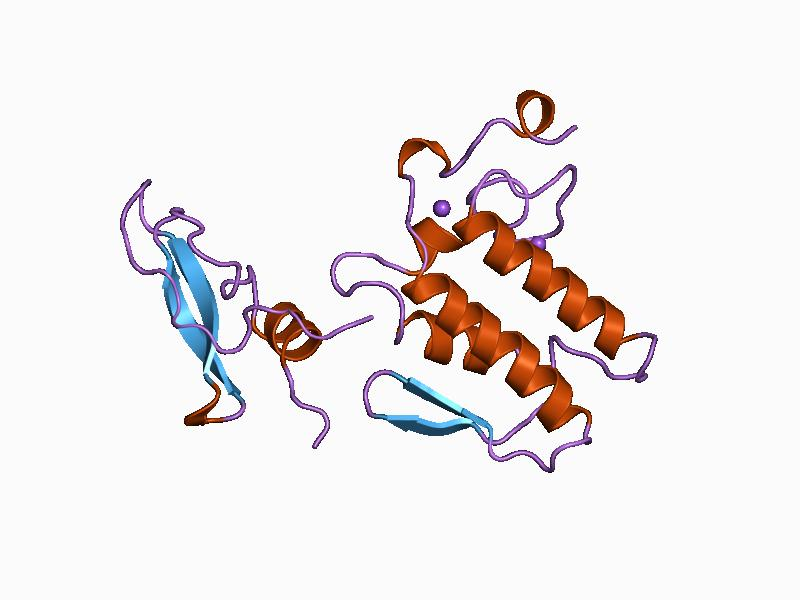
- Schematic diagram of the three-dimensional structure of β_{2}-bungarotoxin (PDB: 1bun)

Identifiers
- Organism: Bungarus multicinctus
- Symbol: N/A
- CAS number: 12778-32-4 β_{1}:65862-89-7 β_{2}:82446-04-6

β-Bungarotoxin is a form of bungarotoxin that is fairly common in Krait (Bungarus multicinctus) venoms. It is the prototypic class of snake β-neurotoxins. There are at least five isoforms, coded β_{1} to β_{5}, assembled from different combinations of A and Bchains.

The toxin is a heterodimer of two chains. The A chain confers phospholipase A2 (PLP A2) activity, and the B chain, like dendrotoxins, have a Kunitz domain. There are many isoforms of these chains: examples of A chains include A1 (P00617), A3 (P00619), and A4 (P17934), and examples of B chains include B2 (P00989) and B3 (Q75S50). The B chain plays a functional role in inducing apoptosis.

The target of this neurotoxin is at the presynaptic terminal, where it blocks release of acetylcholine. It seems to do so by blocking the phosphorylation of MARCKS. It is thought that the dendrotoxin-like B chain acts first by inhibition of ion channels, causing cessation of twitches followed by a prolonged facilitatory phase. The A chain (bearing phospholipase activity) then induces a blocking phase by destruction of phospholipids.

== Binding sites ==
Neurobiological research from the late 1980s has found that beta-bungarotoxin selectively binds to (125)I-DTX-I receptor.

== See also ==
- α-Bungarotoxin
- κ-bungarotoxin
