= Chang Chuan-chiung =

Taiwanese pharmacologist (1928–2024)

- 張傳烱
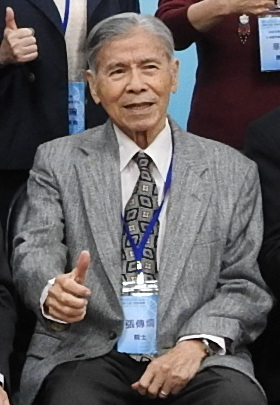
- Born: 23 October 1928
- Died: 1 February 2024 (aged 95)
- Education: National Taiwan University (BS); University of Tokyo (PhD)
- Employer: National Taiwan University

Chang Chuan-chiung (Chinese: 張傳烱; 23 October 1928 – 1 February 2024) was a Taiwanese pharmacologist and professor emeritus of pharmacology at National Taiwan University. He is best known for having isolated bungarotoxin, a still-important agent in neurobiological research.

== Education and career ==
He earned a B.S. from National Taiwan University in 1950, and a Ph.D. at the University of Tokyo in 1965. He later taught at National Taiwan University.

Chang Chuan-chiung was elected a member of Academia Sinica in 1976, within the division of life sciences, for his research into the isolation of bungarotoxin. He was the founding editor of the Journal of Biomedical Science, established by Taiwan's National Science Council in January 1994.

Chang died on 1 February 2024, at the age of 95.
