= Cobratoxin =

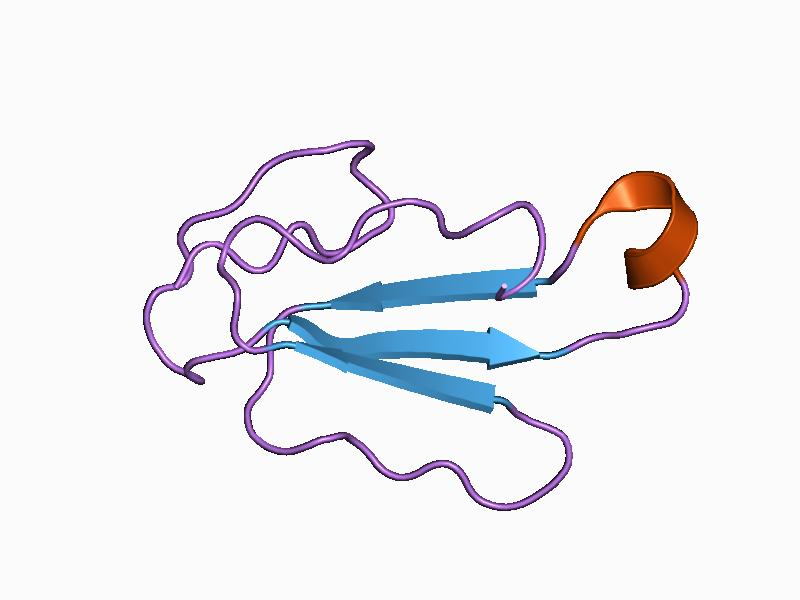
- Ribbon diagram

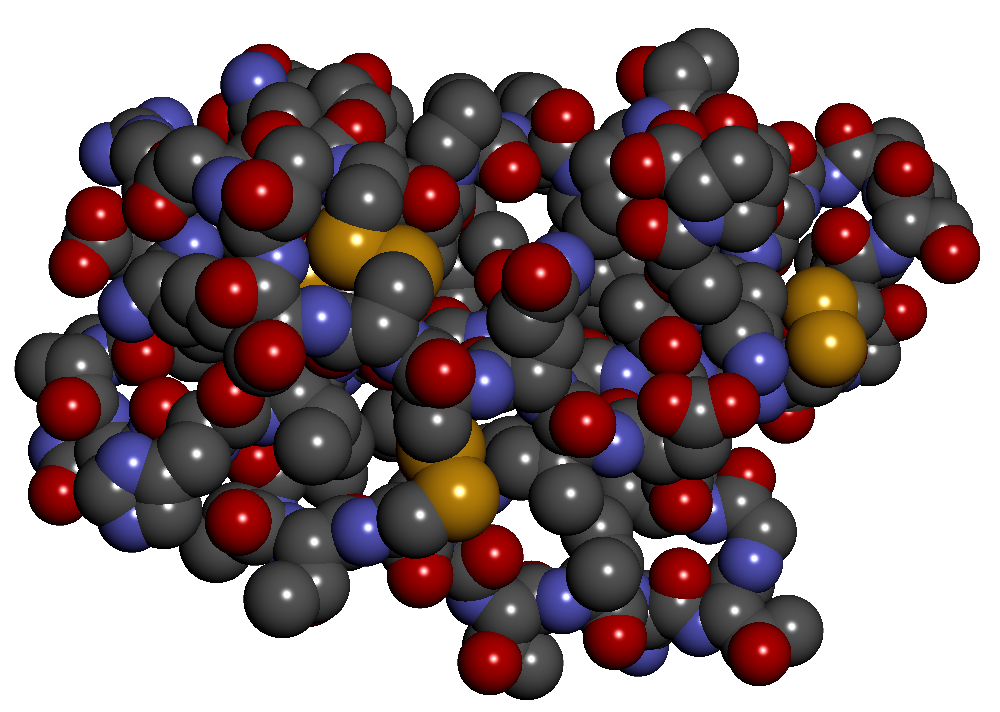
- Space filling diagram

Identifiers
CAS Number	769933-79-1
3D model (JSmol)	Interactive image
ChemSpider	none
PubChem CID	91898464
- InChI: InChI=1S/C277H443N97O98S8/c1-17-121(7)207(261(461)339-156(62-69-203(411)412)235(435)364-208(122(8)18-2)262(462)349-165(90-190(288)395)244(444)360-179(114-478)255(455)361-180(115-479)256(456)367-213(127(13)383)266(466)370-212(126(12)382)265(465)351-168(94-205(415)416)246(446)333-148(44-31-77-309-276(299)300)228(428)357-177(112-476)254(454)347-164(89-189(287)394)243(443)352-169(271(471)472)92-192(290)397)362-199(404)104-316-220(420)162(87-187(285)392)345-225(425)145(39-23-26-72-280)338-260(460)206(120(5)6)363-250(450)173(108-378)356-257(457)182-46-33-79-373(182)269(469)181(116-480)325-198(403)102-317-222(422)174(109-473)323-196(401)101-315-218(418)141(40-27-73-305-272(291)292)327-230(430)155(61-68-202(409)410)340-263(463)210(124(10)380)365-233(433)149(45-32-78-310-277(301)302)334-237(437)157(82-131-48-52-136(387)53-49-131)322-195(400)100-314-219(419)142(41-28-74-306-273(293)294)328-240(440)160(85-134-96-303-117-319-134)343-247(447)167(93-204(413)414)348-227(427)147(43-30-76-308-275(297)298)332-239(439)159(84-133-95-311-140-36-20-19-35-138(133)140)342-226(426)146(42-29-75-307-274(295)296)330-223(423)143(37-21-24-70-278)329-224(424)144(38-22-25-71-279)331-238(438)158(83-132-50-54-137(388)55-51-132)341-252(452)178(113-477)359-245(445)166(91-191(289)396)350-264(464)211(125(11)381)366-234(434)150(59-66-200(405)406)321-194(399)99-312-193(398)98-313-221(421)170(105-375)353-251(451)175(110-474)324-197(402)103-318-259(459)209(123(9)379)369-268(468)215(129(15)385)371-267(467)214(128(14)384)368-258(458)183-47-34-80-374(183)270(470)216(130(16)386)372-236(436)153(58-65-186(284)391)337-248(448)171(106-376)355-249(449)172(107-377)354-231(431)152(57-64-185(283)390)335-229(429)151(56-63-184(282)389)336-242(442)163(88-188(286)393)346-241(441)161(86-135-97-304-118-320-135)344-253(453)176(111-475)358-232(432)154(60-67-201(407)408)326-217(417)139(281)81-119(3)4/h19-20,35-36,48-55,95-97,117-130,139,141-183,206-216,311,375-388,473-480H,17-18,21-34,37-47,56-94,98-116,278-281H2,1-16H3,(H2,282,389)(H2,283,390)(H2,284,391)(H2,285,392)(H2,286,393)(H2,287,394)(H2,288,395)(H2,289,396)(H2,290,397)(H,303,319)(H,304,320)(H,312,398)(H,313,421)(H,314,419)(H,315,418)(H,316,420)(H,317,422)(H,318,459)(H,321,399)(H,322,400)(H,323,401)(H,324,402)(H,325,403)(H,326,417)(H,327,430)(H,328,440)(H,329,424)(H,330,423)(H,331,438)(H,332,439)(H,333,446)(H,334,437)(H,335,429)(H,336,442)(H,337,448)(H,338,460)(H,339,461)(H,340,463)(H,341,452)(H,342,426)(H,343,447)(H,344,453)(H,345,425)(H,346,441)(H,347,454)(H,348,427)(H,349,462)(H,350,464)(H,351,465)(H,352,443)(H,353,451)(H,354,431)(H,355,449)(H,356,457)(H,357,428)(H,358,432)(H,359,445)(H,360,444)(H,361,455)(H,362,404)(H,363,450)(H,364,435)(H,365,433)(H,366,434)(H,367,456)(H,368,458)(H,369,468)(H,370,466)(H,371,467)(H,372,436)(H,405,406)(H,407,408)(H,409,410)(H,411,412)(H,413,414)(H,415,416)(H,471,472)(H4,291,292,305)(H4,293,294,306)(H4,295,296,307)(H4,297,298,308)(H4,299,300,309)(H4,301,302,310)/t121-,122-,123+,124+,125+,126+,127+,128+,129+,130+,139-,141-,142-,143-,144-,145-,146-,147-,148-,149-,150-,151-,152-,153-,154-,155-,156-,157-,158-,159-,160-,161-,162-,163-,164-,165-,166-,167-,168-,169-,170-,171-,172-,173-,174-,175-,176-,177-,178-,179-,180-,181-,182-,183-,206-,207-,208-,209-,210-,211-,212-,213-,214-,215-,216-/m0/s1 Key: BVGLZNQZEYAYBJ-QWZQWHGGSA-N
- SMILES: CCC(C)C(C(=O)NC(CCC(=O)O)C(=O)NC(C(C)CC)C(=O)NC(CC(=O)N)C(=O)NC(CS)C(=O)NC(CS)C(=O)NC(C(C)O)C(=O)NC(C(C)O)C(=O)NC(CC(=O)O)C(=O)NC(CCCN=C(N)N)C(=O)NC(CS)C(=O)NC(CC(=O)N)C(=O)NC(CC(=O)N)C(=O)O)NC(=O)CNC(=O)C(CC(=O)N)NC(=O)C(CCCCN)NC(=O)C(C(C)C)NC(=O)C(CO)NC(=O)C1CCCN1C(=O)C(CS)NC(=O)CNC(=O)C(CS)NC(=O)CNC(=O)C(CCCN=C(N)N)NC(=O)C(CCC(=O)O)NC(=O)C(C(C)O)NC(=O)C(CCCN=C(N)N)NC(=O)C(CC2=CC=C(C=C2)O)NC(=O)CNC(=O)C(CCCN=C(N)N)NC(=O)C(CC3=CN=CN3)NC(=O)C(CC(=O)O)NC(=O)C(CCCN=C(N)N)NC(=O)C(CC4=CNC5=CC=CC=C54)NC(=O)C(CCCN=C(N)N)NC(=O)C(CCCCN)NC(=O)C(CCCCN)NC(=O)C(CC6=CC=C(C=C6)O)NC(=O)C(CS)NC(=O)C(CC(=O)N)NC(=O)C(C(C)O)NC(=O)C(CCC(=O)O)NC(=O)CNC(=O)CNC(=O)C(CO)NC(=O)C(CS)NC(=O)CNC(=O)C(C(C)O)NC(=O)C(C(C)O)NC(=O)C(C(C)O)NC(=O)C7CCCN7C(=O)C(C(C)O)NC(=O)C(CCC(=O)N)NC(=O)C(CO)NC(=O)C(CO)NC(=O)C(CCC(=O)N)NC(=O)C(CCC(=O)N)NC(=O)C(CC(=O)N)NC(=O)C(CC8=CN=CN8)NC(=O)C(CS)NC(=O)C(CCC(=O)O)NC(=O)C(CC(C)C)N

Properties
Chemical formula	C_{277}H_{443}N_{97}O_{98}S_{8}
Molar mass	6956.65 g·mol^{−1}
- Except where otherwise noted, data are given for materials in their standard state (at 25 °C [77 °F], 100 kPa). Infobox references

α-Cobratoxin is a substance of the venom of certain Naja cobras. It is a nicotinic acetylcholine receptor (nAChR) antagonist which causes paralysis by preventing the binding of acetylcholine to the nAChR.

== Sources ==
α-Cobratoxin is a neurotoxin from the venom of certain Naja genus, including the Thailand cobra, the Indochinese spitting cobra (Naja siamensis) and the Chinese cobra (Naja atra). The cobras that produce the toxin live in tropical and subtropical regions of Africa and Asia. The venom, produced by these snakes, is a mixture of proteins, carbohydrates, and other substances. The venom is only used when the snake needs it for survival, because it costs a lot of effort to produce. If poisoning a subject is not necessary, it can bite without excreting the venom. When the snake does use it, it mostly tries to immobilize or kill its prey.

== Structure ==
α-Cobratoxin forms three hairpin type loops with its polypeptide chain. The two minor loops are loop I (amino acids 1–17) and loop III (amino acids 43–57). Loop II (amino acids 18–42) is the major one. Following these loops, α-cobratoxin has a tail (amino acids 58–71). The loops are knotted together by four disulfide bonds (Cys3-Cys20, Cys14-Cys41, Cys45-Cys56, and Cys57-Cys62). Loop II contains another disulfide bridge at the lower tip (Cys26-Cys30).

Stabilization of the major loop occurs through β-sheet formation. The β-sheet structure extends to amino acids 53-57 of loop III. Here it forms a triple-stranded, antiparallel β-sheet. This β-sheet has an overall right-handed twist6. This β-sheet consists of eight hydrogen bonds. The folded tip is held stable by two α-helical and two β-turn hydrogen bonds.

The first loop is stabilized because of one β-turn and two β-sheet hydrogen bonds. Loop III stays intact because of a β-turn and hydrophobic interactions.

The tail of the α-cobratoxin structure is attached to the rest of the structure by disulfide bridge Cys57-Cys62. It is also stabilized by the tightly hydrogen bound side chain of Asn63.

In conclusion, the whole is held together by disulfide bonds and the loops are kept stable by β-turns and β-sheets.

== Available forms ==
α-Cobratoxin can occur in both a monomeric form and a disulfide-bound dimeric form. α-Cobratoxin dimers can be homodimeric as well as heterodimeric with cytotoxin 1, cytotoxin 2 and cytotoxin 3. As a homodimer it is still able to bind to muscle type and α7 nAChRs, but with a lower affinity than in its monomeric form. In addition the homodimer acquires the capacity to block α-3/β-2 nAChRs.

== Bioinformatics and reactivity ==
The sequence of α-cobratoxin is: IRCFITPDITSKDCPNGHVCYTKTWCDAFCSIRGKRVDLGCAATCPTVKTGVDIQCCSTDNCNPFPTRKRP

The venom has different aminoacids that are able to bind reactively to the acetylcholine receptors. These receptors can bind different ligands like acetylcholine, nicotine and cobratoxin. Lysine, K at position 23 binds selectively to Torpedo AChR (Acetylcholine receptor). The aminoacids that bind to both neuronal and Torpedo AChRs are tryptophan at position 25, aspartic acid at 27, phenylalanine at 29, arginine at 33 and 36 and phenylalanine at 65. The aminoacids responsible for the binding to alpha-7 AChR are cysteine at 26 and 30, alanine at 28 and lysine at positions 35 and 49.

== Mode of action ==
α-Cobratoxin binds antagonistically and slowly reversible to muscle-type and neuronal type nAChRs. This bond will block the receptor's ability to bind acetylcholine and thereby inhibits the ion flow through the postsynaptic membrane, which will lead to paralysation.

nAChRs can obtain their open conformation by a twist-like motion as seen in figure X. But this opening would only last up to 3 ms, which is too short for initiating an ion-flux. When acetylcholine binds to the receptor it remains in the open conformation for a longer period which is sufficient to cause the ion-flux. When a complex was formed with an α7 receptor-like protein(AChBP-complex) and 5 α-Cobratoxins, it is not able to twist anymore.

Cobratoxin binds to the ligand-binding pocket between the α/γ or α/δ nAChR subunits. It causes a postsynaptic block at the NMJ nAChRs by preventing the binding of acetylcholine to its receptor. Long neurotoxins like Cobratoxin also block neuronal α7 nAChRs, but it is unclear how effectively the long neurotoxin can reach the central nervous system (CNS).

== Indications ==
Indications for the bite of a cobra, in this case the Naja atra (Chinese cobra) are the darkening of the bite wound and pain and swelling of the area around it. Necrosis is a very severe result of the snake bite, and can keep harming the victim for years after the attack. Of course the Chinese cobra is only one of the snakes that produce cobratoxin, but the other snakes cause similar indications.

== Effects ==
The cobratoxin of the Thailand cobra belongs to the neurotoxins. An important property of neurotoxins is that they are not usually able to cross the blood-brain barrier. Instead of this, they block the nerve transmission in the body. α-Cobratoxin is a post-synaptic neurotoxin, which reversibly blocks the nicotinic acetylcholine receptors. A bite of the Thailand Cobra therefore leads to muscle paralysis. Because of that paralysis, respiratory problems may develop, which can lead to death. The moment when the neurotoxin begins affecting the body can vary from minutes to a few hours after the bite. At first, the venom will cause weakness as a consequence of the nerve transmission blocking. The first real symptoms of paralysis will be palpebral ptosis (drooping of the eyelids) and external ophthalmoplegia, which is also an eye movement disorder. The reason for this is that the ocular muscles are more susceptible, in comparison with other muscles, for the nerve transmission blocking. The next muscles affected are the facial and neck muscles followed by the respiratory muscles and the limbs after another few hours. By then, the victim gets trouble breathing and will not survive this for a very long time.

== Toxicity ==
The Naja Kaouthia venom is a member of the snake three-finger toxin family in the subfamily type II alpha-neurotoxin. The lethal dose (LD50) of α-cobratoxin is 0,1 mg/kg by intravenous injection into mice15. The toxin occurs as a monomer but can form a homodimer or heterodimers with cytotoxins 1,2, and 3 through disulfide linkage. The monomeric form can bind with high affinity to muscular, Torpedo, and neuronal alpha-7 nicotinic acetylcholine receptors (nAChR). As mentioned before, binding to the nAChR it prevents acetylcholine binding to the receptor, which causes paralysis.

== Antitoxin and vaccines ==
In the last few years there are some new developments to create an antitoxin or a vaccine for the toxic snake bites.

=== Genetic vaccine ===
In 2005 a genetic vaccine for cobratoxin was developed which encodes for a non-toxic cobratoxin variant. To develop this non-toxic component, some alterations were made in the cDNA for the cobratoxin. Two residues, critical for binding to the nicotinic acetylcholine receptors, were substituted (Asp27 to Arg and Arg33 to Gly).This created protein has the same 3D-structure as the original toxin but leads also to protective immunity. This synthesized vaccine could protect a victim against a dangerous snake venom. Because of these promising results, the creation of a global health program must be considered which can save people who are at risk of a snakebite.

=== Rediocides A and G ===
Rediocides A and G are found to be a possible antitoxin for α-cobratoxin. These rediocides bind at the same nicotinic acetylcholine receptor as the snake poison does. Because a number of the binding sites are occupied with rediocides, α-cobratoxin is not able to bind the receptor any longer. From an investigation it was found that rediocides can prolong the survival time of mice infected by cobratoxin. When the rediocide is injected (0.5 mg/kg) immediately after the toxification, the survival time is not prolonged. When it is injected thirty minutes before the toxification, the survival time will be prolonged. The rediocides are able to bind at the nicotinic acetylcholine receptor. When cobratoxin has already bound, this binding is much stronger and rediocides cannot compete with it.

== Applications in biomedicine ==
Although cobratoxin is a relatively toxic and dangerous poison it also has a beneficial side. It is a natural and biological venom and its components certainly have a potential therapeutic value which is useful for the biomedicine.

=== Painkiller ===
In 2011, an investigation showed that cobratoxin could inhibit nociception, the sensation of pain. During this investigation inflammatory pain was induced on rats using formalin. The results showed that cobratoxin exhibited a dose-dependent pain-killing effect on this formalin induced pain. Apparently, when the nAChr receptors in the central nervous system gets activated it provokes anti-nociceptive effects .

=== Multiple sclerosis ===
Multiple sclerosis, briefly MS, is an autoimmune disease of the central nervous system (CNS). The immune system attacks the CNS which leads to demyelination. Myelin forms a layer, the myelin sheath, around the axons and neurons. When this sheath is damaged the transport of action potentials will no longer work effectively. The cause of this disease is still unknown but there is a possible chance that the disease is induced or worsened by viral infection. It appears to be that cobra venoms such as cobratoxin have an 'antiviral, immunomodulatory and a neuromodulatory activity'. These properties make it a suitable candidate for a study in subjects with MS and contribute to the disease process.

=== Lung cancer ===
In 2009 promising results showed that the acetylcholine receptor plays an import role in developing lung cancer. Nicotine stimulates the tumor growth on our lungs. By binding to this receptor it activates some pathways which will block the apoptosis. As a consequence, unregulated cell proliferation occurs. This cell proliferation caused by nicotine could be blocked by using cobratoxin. Cobratoxin was at one time thought to block the acetylcholine receptor because of the high affinity; however, in 2011 this theory has been disproven and the original article was retracted for fabrication of results. Mice treated with cobratoxin did not show any significant reduction in tumor growth. The conclusion of these results, in contrast with earlier results, was that the acetylcholine receptor inhibitors neither suppressed growth of the lung tumors nor prolonged the lives of the mice.
