= Kappa-Bungarotoxin =

Protein neurotoxin of the bungarotoxin family

κ-Bungarotoxin (kappa-bungarotoxin) is a neurotoxin that is part of the bungarotoxin family. The neurotoxin can be found in the venom of the many-banded krait (Bungarus multicinctus). This snake species can be found in China, Myanmar, Laos, North Vietnam and Thailand. The toxin attacks the neuronal nicotinic acetylcholine receptors, inhibiting neurotransmission. Even though a snake bite of this species is rare, they do have a case-fatality range from 7% to 50%. Death can occur between 6 and 30 hours after a Bungarus multicinctus snakebite.

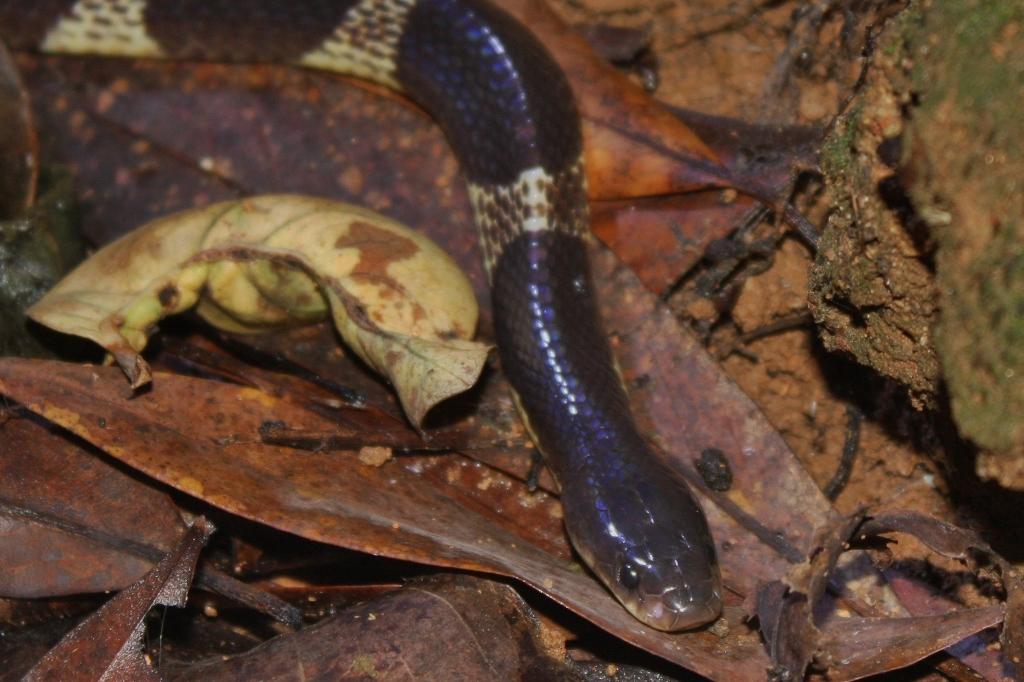
Many-banded krait

== History ==
The neurotoxin was reported in 1983 when researchers studied the snake venom for their effects on neuromuscular transmission. Since then, it has contributed to the knowledge about synaptic transmission, cholinergic synapses, and nicotinic acetylcholine receptors (nAChRs). κ-Bungarotoxin is still widely used in research due to its specificity to various nAChRs.

The toxin got the kappa in its name as reference to the Latin word kiliaris, which means "related to the eye", from which the ciliary ganglion got its name. Two toxins, named "toxin F" and "bungarotoxin 2.1" were identified by protein sequencing the same way as κ-bungarotoxin.

== Chemical infobox ==
κ-Bungarotoxin
Properties
Picture	Structure of κ-bungarotoxin
Alternative names	Kappa-bgt κ-Bungarotoxin Kappa-1-Bungarotoxin
Organism name	Bungarus multicinctus (many-banded krait)
Site of expression	Venom gland
Toxin family	Three-finger toxins (3FTx)^{[22]}
Molecular formula	C_{303}H_{475}N_{91}O_{97}S_{10}
Molecular weight	7313 Da
Sequence	RTCLISPSSTPQTCPNGQDICFLKAQCDKFCSIRGPVIEQGCVATCPQFRSNYRSLLCCT TDNCNH-OH
Appearance	Typically purified as a crystalline or lyophilized protein powder
Odor	Odorless in its purified form
Solubility	Soluble in water
Main hazard	Toxic
Pictogram	Globally Harmonized Symbol for acute toxicity

== Structure and reactivity ==
κ-Bungarotoxin has a single polypeptide chain consisting of 66 amino acids. The overall weight of this chain is 7313 DA. Two single polypeptide chains can arrange together into a dimer. The subunit of the dimer consists of three main chain loops. These loops have a rotation of 178.6 degrees.

Overall, κ-bungarotoxin has ten beta strands. This forms a six stranded antiparallel beta sheet configuration^{[8]}. This is formed by three out of the five beta strands of each subunit of the dimer. Arg 34 is at the top of the central loop for each subunit. The outer strand of loop III is involved in an antiparallel arrangement.

The κ-bungarotoxin dimer can make disulfide bonds, hydrogen bonds and van der Waals connections.

- Hydrogen bonds: six main chain hydrogen bonds and three side chain hydrogen bonds can be made
- Van Der Waals interactions: Phe 49 and Leu 57 can form Van Der Waals interactions across the dimer
- Disulfide bonds: the polypeptide chain has 10 cysteine residues that can form five disulfide bonds

The toxin shows high affinity for the nicotinic acetylcholine receptor (nAChRs) in the postsynaptic membrane, mostly the ones containing the α3 with an IC_{50} smaller than 100 nM. This means blocking nicotinic transmission at very low concentrations. Loop II is most important for binding the nAChRs. The two binding surfaces are both the N-terminal extracellular regions of the receptor subunit. These are the 51-70 and 183-201 residues. The most important is Arg-34 at position 36 for binding the α3 receptors. However, κ-bungarotoxin has low affinity for neuromuscular receptors.

== Available forms ==
κ-Bungarotoxin naturally occurs in Bungarus multicinctus venom glands^{[11]}. The polypeptide consists of 66 amino acids and is cross-linked by five disulfide bonds. This is similar to LS-III, a venom purified from Laticauda semifasciata^{[12]}.

κ-Bungarotoxin can form heterodimers, thereby creating κ-2-Bungarotoxin and κ-3-Bungarotoxin. These differences are also observed globally. Though both κ-2- and κ-3-bungarotoxin are derived from Bungarus multicinctus venom, these are prevalent in the province of Guangdong, China, whereas κ-bungarotoxin is found in the Taiwanese B. multicinctus. These forms might have an evolutionary advantage in each specific region.

Another form of κ-bungarotoxin is the α-bungarotoxin. κ-Bungarotoxin exhibits a 47% structural homology to α-bungarotoxin, but has an even shorter COOH-terminal than LS-III. α-Bungarotoxin also consists of the amino acid tryptanophyl, which is not present in κ-bungarotoxin. α-Bungarotoxin binds with a 200 times stronger affinity to nicotinic receptors than κ-bungarotoxin.

Lastly, β-bungarotoxin also resembles the bungarotoxin family. β-Bungarotoxin is a potent inhibitor of the transport system for choline on the presynaptic terminal. It differs in the fact that β-bungarotoxin does not bind to a receptor, but binds enzymatically. β-Bungarotoxin will bind to voltage-gated potassium channels, after which phospholipase A_{2}-mediated destruction of membrane phospholipids occurs in the nerves.

== Synthesis ==
There are several ways of synthesizing κ-bungarotoxin:

1. κ-Bungarotoxin can be extracted from the Bungarus multicinctus venom glands. Upon extraction, the κ-bungarotoxin needs to be isolated and purified for further use.
2. Another way to yield κ-bungarotoxin is by chemically synthesizing the gene which codes for the toxin. Transplanting this gene into Escherichia coli does not result in a stable product. However, after fusing the toxin with rat intestinal fatty acids, the fusion proteins differed only in cleavage sites. Hereafter, the κ-bungarotoxin could be isolated and purified.
3. Further research discovered that an active form of yeast, Pichia pastoris, was able to make biologically active Kappa-Bungarotoxin. This process does not require additional manipulation of genes or proteins. Furthermore, the produced quantity is five times higher than that of E. coli produced κ-bungarotoxin.

== Mechanism and toxicity ==
κ-Bungarotoxin works as a postsynaptic neurotoxin. The postsynaptic neurotoxin is a prolonged, potentially irreversible, competitive antagonist of neuronal nicotinic acetylcholine receptors (nAChRs). Though α-bungarotoxin specifically binds to muscle nAChRs, κ-bungarotoxin targets the α3 and α4 - though α4 to a lesser extent - subunits of the nAChR in the central and autonomic nervous system, specifically in the avian ciliary ganglia because the α3 subunit of the nAChR is the main ganglionic type. One of Kappa-Bungarotoxin's target sites is the same as that of Alpha-Bungarotoxin, whereas the second target site of the nicotinic receptor is exclusively bound by κ-bungarotoxin. This, because neuronal nAChRs contain a broader variety of subunits than muscle nAChRs.

By binding with a high affinity to the acetylcholine binding site of the neuronal nAChRs, Kappa-Bungarotoxin blocks these receptors for an eventual acetylcholine to bind. Normally, activation of the neuronal nAChRs by acetylcholine would release several neurotransmitters and generate inward ion influx, creating action potentials. However, when Kappa-Bungarotoxin is bound to the neuronal nAChRs, it inhibits depolarization at 75 nM and thus synaptic transmission. This blockade leads to the disruption of neuronal communication in the central nervous system and ganglia, causing neuromuscular paralysis and respiratory failure in prolonged κ-bungarotoxin exposure.

== Biotransformation ==
After the bite of Bungarus multicinctus the venom enters the bloodstream and enters the circulation and ends up in the central and peripheral nervous system. Since κ-bungarotoxin has a high affinity for nAChRs the venom will target the tissues rich in nAChRs. Together with its prolonged, potentially irreversible binding, there will not be much κ-bungarotoxin available in the bloodstream, but it will remain localized in the central nervous system and ganglia. Unbound nAChRs will only be available through de novo synthesis of these receptors.

Though biotransformation of κ-bungarotoxin is not sufficiently researched, the long-chain three-finger toxins (3FTx) family member blocks ion channels on the postsynaptic membrane. Therefore, it is suggested that the toxin works extracellularly, and can thus not be biotransformed by the cytochrome P450 enzymes. κ-Bungarotoxin is a protein and can thus be gradually degraded by enzymes such as peptidases and lysosomes. The result will be smaller peptides and amino acids, which can be used for the synthesis of endogenous compounds. However, since the κ-bungarotoxin's affinity for the neuronal nAChR is very high, not much of the protein can be degraded before the ligand-receptor complex is formed.

== Animal toxicity ==
κ-Bungarotoxin can selectively bind to neuronal nAChRs, by which it inhibits or blocks neurotransmission. The toxin shows different effects in diverse animals. For instance, in insects, κ-bungarotoxin blocks transmission at the cholinergic synapse between mechanosensory neurons and an interneuron in the terminal abdominal ganglion. It also blocks nAChRs on a motor neuron in the metathoracic ganglion of a cockroach.

Muscle nAChRs in nematodes show a higher sensitivity to κ-bungarotoxin than the alpha-version of the bungarotoxin. Compared to another toxin, only a concentration of 10 nM was needed to block the muscle receptor instead of 100 nM. This also means that there is a difference in effects of the toxin on different animals, because it appears that nematodes are more sensitive to κ-bungarotoxin than insects.

In chicks, the κ-bungarotoxin seems to bind with a low affinity to skeletal muscle nicotinic receptors^{[12]}. Although the effects on the chicks have not been described, following the mechanism it is expected that there will be either none or a small amount of muscle paralysis at a low concentration of κ-bungarotoxin. However, the toxin does bind with high affinity to the neuronal nicotinic receptors in the autonomic ganglia, which can block the synaptic transmission already at a low concentration. This would cause effects like respiratory failure.

== Human adverse effects ==
After the bite, almost no pain will be felt at the bite site. However, after a (short) while, speech may slur, swallowing will become more difficult and the person might feel dizzy. Somewhat later, the weakness can spread from the face region to the limbs, and muscles may become slightly paralyzed. Respiratory failure, such as shortness of breath, can happen as well in this stage. After 6-30 hours of the envenomation, victims may be unable to move or unable to breathe. Death can occur when cardiac arrest happens due to lack of oxygen. About 27.3% of the patients in Taiwan experienced either general pain symptoms or respiratory failure.

There is specific antivenom available in Taiwan but this may not effectively prevent respiratory failure and pain. Patients must be closely monitored within the first few hours of envenomation for signs of paralysis and respiratory distress.
