= Snake venom =

Highly modified saliva containing zootoxins

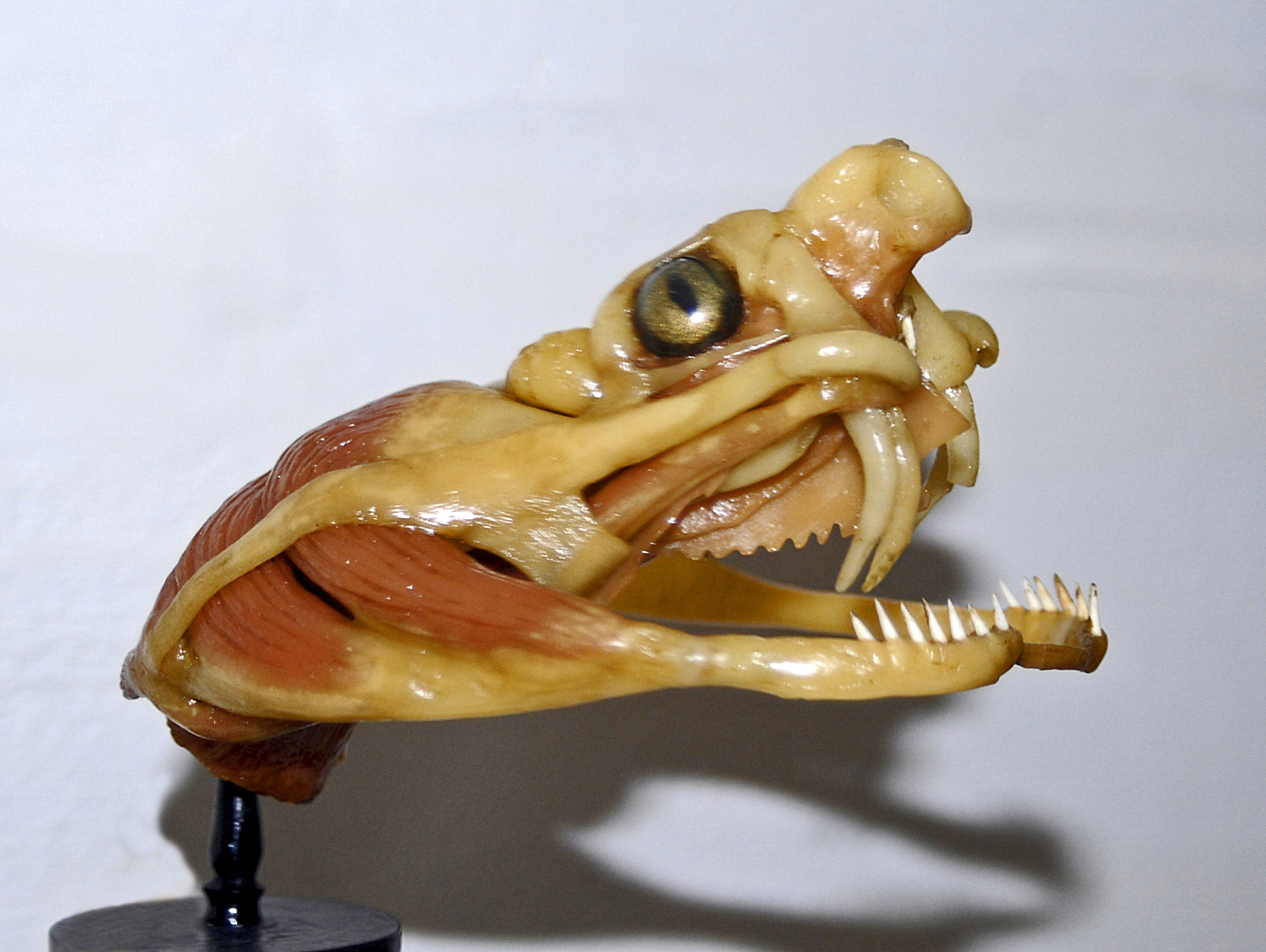
Vipera berus – Venom delivery apparatus

Snake venom is a highly toxic saliva containing zootoxins that facilitates in the immobilization and digestion of prey. This also provides defense against threats. Snake venom is usually injected by unique fangs during a bite, though some species are also able to spit venom.

The venom glands that secrete zootoxins are a modification of the parotid salivary glands found in other vertebrates and are usually located on each side of the head, below and behind the eye, and enclosed in a muscular sheath. The venom is stored in large glands called alveoli before being conveyed by a duct to the base of channeled or tubular fangs through which it is ejected.

Venom contains more than 20 different compounds, which are mostly proteins and polypeptides. The complex mixture of proteins, enzymes, and various other substances has toxic and lethal properties. Venom serves to immobilize prey. Enzymes in venom play an important role in the digestion of prey, and various other substances are responsible for important but non-lethal biological effects. Some of the proteins in snake venom have very specific effects on various biological functions, including blood coagulation, blood pressure regulation, and transmission of nerve or muscle impulses. These venoms have been studied and developed for use as pharmacological or diagnostic tools, and even drugs.

== Chemistry ==
Proteins constitute 90-95% of venom's dry weight and are responsible for almost all of its biological effects. The hundreds, even thousands, of proteins found in venom include toxins, neurotoxins in particular, as well as nontoxic proteins (which also have pharmacological properties), and many enzymes, especially hydrolytic ones. Enzymes (molecular weight 13-150 KDa) make up 80-90% of viperid and 25-70% of elapid venoms, including digestive hydrolases, L-amino-acid oxidase, phospholipases, thrombin-like pro-coagulant, and kallikrein-like serine proteases and metalloproteinases (hemorrhagins), which damage vascular endothelium. Polypeptide toxins (molecular weight 5-10 KDa) include cytotoxins, cardiotoxins, and postsynaptic neurotoxins (such as α-bungarotoxin and α-Cobratoxin), which bind to acetylcholine receptors at neuromuscular junctions. Compounds with low molecular weight (up to 1.5 KDa) include metals, peptides, lipids, nucleosides, carbohydrates, amines, and oligopeptides, which inhibit angiotensin-converting enzyme (ACE) and potentiate bradykinin (BPP). Inter- and intra-species variation in venom chemical composition is geographical and ontogenic. Phosphodiesterases interfere with the prey's cardiac system, mainly to lower the blood pressure. Phospholipase A2 causes hemolysis by lysing the phospholipid cell membranes of red blood cells. Amino acid oxidases and proteases are used for digestion. Amino acid oxidase also triggers some other enzymes and is responsible for the yellow colour of the venom of some species. Hyaluronidase increases tissue permeability to accelerate the absorption of other enzymes into tissues. Some snake venoms carry fasciculins, like the mambas (Dendroaspis), which inhibit cholinesterase to make the prey lose muscle control.

Main enzymes of snake venom
Type	Name	Origin
Oxidoreductases	lactate dehydrogenase	Elapidae
	L-amino-acid oxidase	All species
	Catalase	All species
Transferases	Alanine amino transferase	
Hydrolases	Phospholipase A2	All species
	Lysophospholipase	Elapidae, Viperidae
	Acetylcholinesterase	Elapidae
	Alkaline phosphatase	Bothrops atrox
	Acid phosphatase	Deinagkistrodon acutus
	5'-nucleotidase	All species
	Phosphodiesterase	All species
	Deoxyribonuclease	All species
	Ribonuclease 1	All species
	Adenosine triphosphatase	All species
	Amylase	All species
	Hyaluronidase	All species
	NAD-Nucleotidase	All species
	Kininogenase	Viperidae
	Factor X activator	Viperidae, Crotalinae
	Heparinase	Crotalinae
	α-Fibrinogenase	Viperidae, Crotalinae
	β-Fibrinogenase	Viperidae, Crotalinae
	α-β-Fibrinogenase	Bitis gabonica
	Fibrinolytic enzyme	Crotalinae
	Prothrombin activator	Crotalinae
	Collagenase	Viperidae
	Elastase	Viperidae
Lyases	Glucosaminate ammonia-lyase	

Snake toxins vary greatly in their functions. The two broad classes of toxins found in snake venoms are neurotoxins (mostly found in elapids) and hemotoxins (mostly found in viperids). However, exceptions occur – the venom of the black-necked spitting cobra (Naja nigricollis), an elapid, consists mainly of cytotoxins, while that of the Mojave rattlesnake (Crotalus scutulatus), a viperid, is primarily neurotoxic. Both elapids and viperids may carry numerous other types of toxins.

α-neurotoxins	α-Bungarotoxin, α-toxin, erabutoxin, cobratoxin
β-neurotoxins (PLA2)	β-Bungarotoxin, Notexin, ammodytoxin, crotoxin, taipoxin
κ-neurotoxins	Kappa-bungarotoxin
Dendrotoxins (Kunitz)	Dendrotoxin, toxins I and K; possibly β-Bungarotoxin chain B
Cardiotoxins	Naja nigricollis y-toxin, cardiotoxin III (aka cytotoxins)
Myotoxins	Myotoxin-a, crotamine
Sarafotoxins	Sarafotoxins a, b, and c
Hemorrhagins (metalloprotease)	Mucrolysin, Atrolysins, Acutolysins, etc.
Hemotoxins (serine protease)	Venombin A

== Toxins ==
=== Neurotoxins ===
Structure of a typical chemical synapse

The beginning of a new neural impulse goes as follows:

1. An exchange of ions (charged atoms) across the nerve cell membrane sends a depolarizing current towards the end of the nerve cell (cell terminus).
2. When the depolarizing current arrives at the nerve cell terminus, the neurotransmitter acetylcholine (ACh), which is held in vesicles, is released into the space between the two nerves (synapse). It moves across the synapse to the postsynaptic receptors.
3. ACh binds to the receptors and transfers the signal to the target cell, and after a short time, it's destroyed by acetylcholinesterase.

==== Fasciculins ====
These toxins attack cholinergic neurons (those that use ACh as a transmitter) by destroying acetylcholinesterase (AChE). ACh, therefore, cannot be broken down and stays in the receptor. This causes tetany (involuntary muscle contraction), which can lead to death. The toxins have been called fasciculins since after injection into mice, they cause severe, generalized and long-lasting (5-7 h) fasciculations (rapid muscle contractions).
Snake example: found mostly in the venom of mambas (Dendroaspis spp.) and some rattlesnakes (Crotalus spp.)

==== Dendrotoxins ====
Dendrotoxins inhibit neurotransmissions by blocking the exchange of positive and negative ions across the neuronal membrane lead to no nerve impulse, thereby paralyzing the nerves.
Snake example: mambas

==== α-neurotoxins ====
Alpha-neurotoxins are a large group; over 100 postsynaptic neurotoxins having been identified and sequenced. α-neurotoxins attack the Nicotinic acetylcholine receptors of cholinergic neurons. They mimic the shape of the acetylcholine molecule, and so fit into the receptors, where they block the ACh flow, leading to a feeling of numbness and paralysis.
Snake examples: king cobra (Ophiophagus hannah) (known as hannahtoxin containing α-neurotoxins), sea snakes (Hydrophiinae) (known as erabutoxin), many-banded krait (Bungarus multicinctus) (known as α-bungarotoxin), and cobras (Naja spp.) (known as cobratoxin)

=== Cytotoxins ===
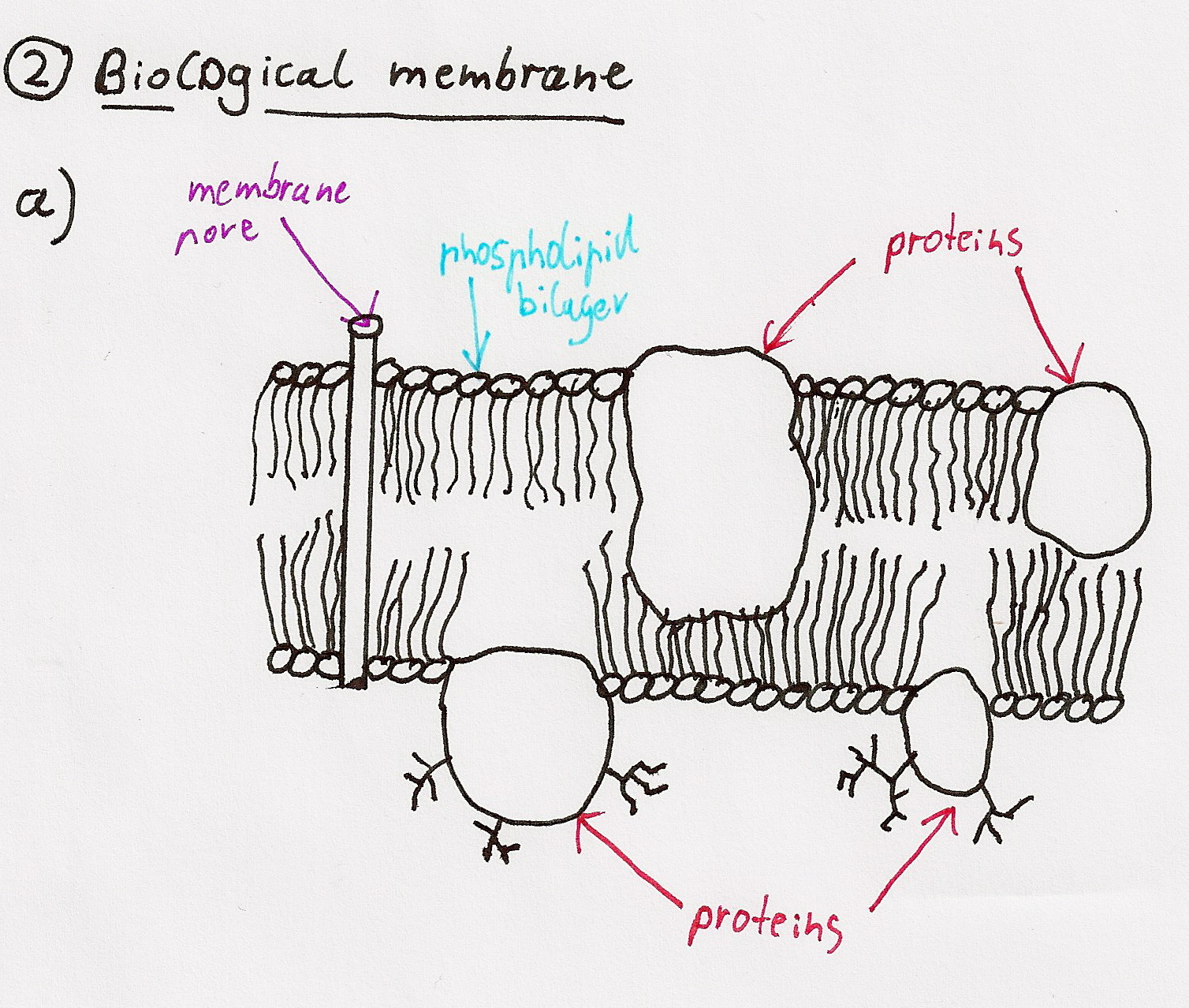
Fully functional membrane

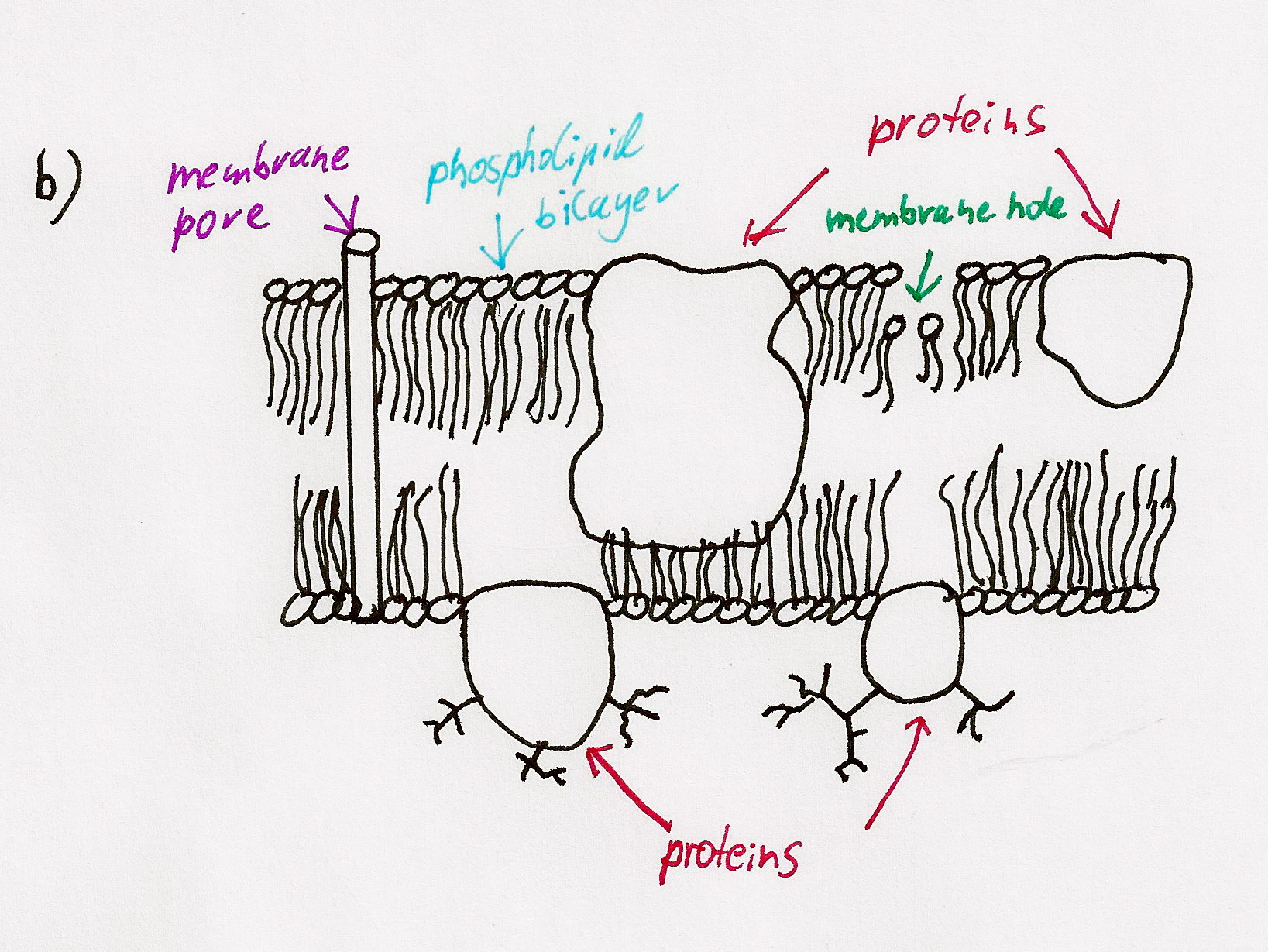
Destroyed membrane

==== Phospholipases ====
Phospholipase is an enzyme that transforms the phospholipid molecule into a lysophospholipid (soap) → the new molecule attracts and binds fat and ruptures cell membranes. Phospholipase A2 is one specific type of phospholipases found in snake venom.
Snake example: Okinawan habu (Trimeresurus flavoviridis)

==== Cardiotoxins / Cytotoxins ====
Cardiotoxins are components that are specifically toxic to the heart. They bind to particular sites on the surface of muscle cells and cause depolarisation → the toxin prevents muscle contraction. These toxins may cause the heart to beat irregularly or stop beating, causing death. An example is the three-fingered cardiotoxin III from Chinese cobra, an example of the short three-fingered family (InterPro: IPR003572).
Snake example: mambas, and some Naja species

==== Hemotoxins ====
Hemotoxins cause hemolysis, the destruction of red blood cells (erythrocytes), or induce blood coagulation (clotting, e.g. mucrocetin) They may also prevent blood clotting, causing the victim to bleed out. A common family of hemotoxins includes snake venom metalloproteinases such as mucrolysin.
Snake examples: most vipers and many cobra species: The tropical rattlesnake Crotalus durissus produces convulxin, a coagulant.

=== Myotoxins ===
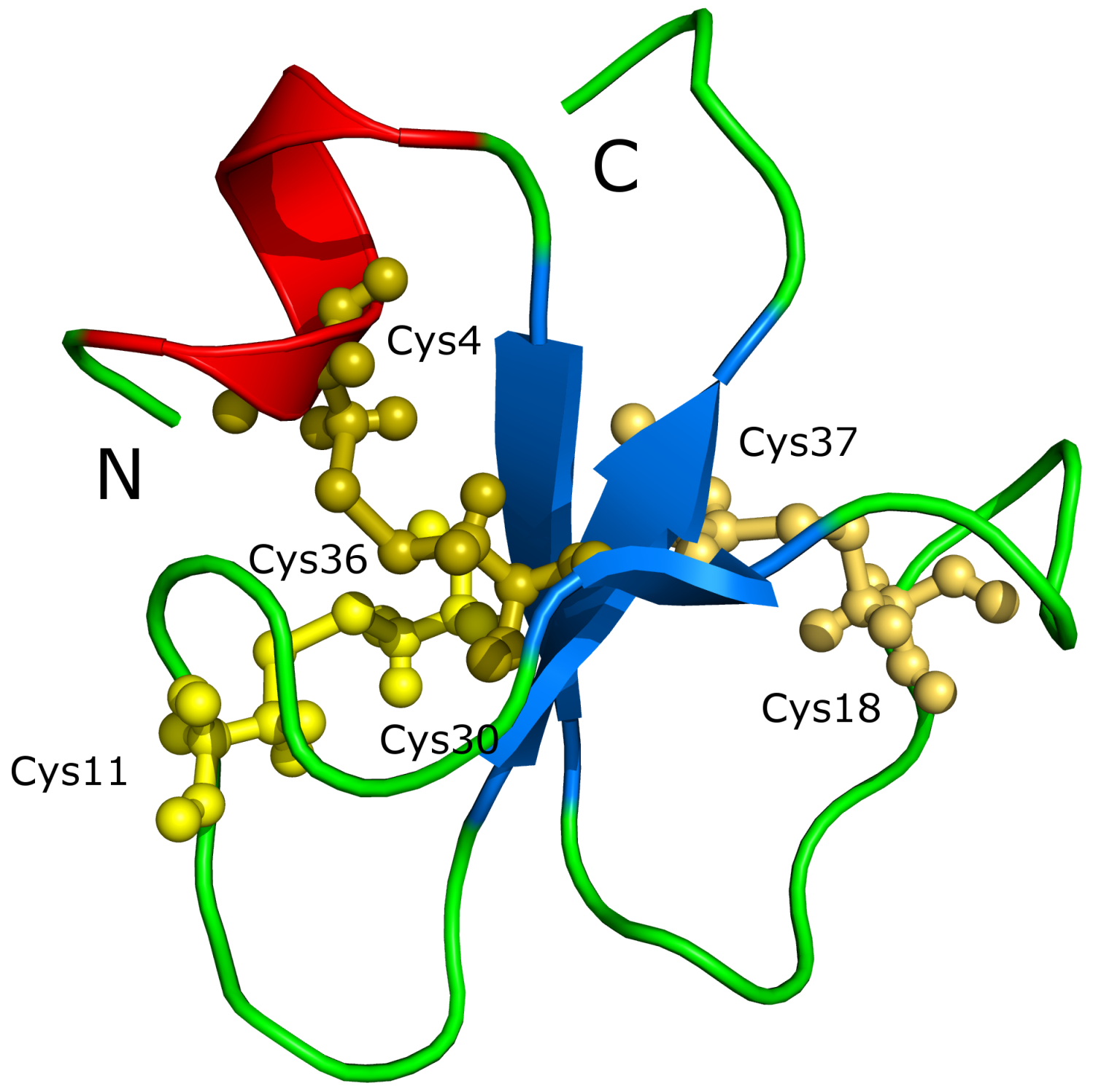
The tertiary structure of crotamine (PDB: 1H5O)

Myotoxins are small, basic peptides found in rattlesnake and lizard (e.g. Mexican beaded lizard) venoms. This involves a non-enzymatic mechanism that leads to severe skeletal muscle necrosis. These peptides act very quickly, causing instantaneous paralysis to prevent prey from escaping and eventually death due to diaphragmatic paralysis.

The first myotoxin to be identified and isolated was crotamine, discovered in the 1950s by Brazilian scientist José Moura Gonçalves from the venom of tropical South American rattlesnake Crotalus durissus terrificus. Its biological actions, molecular structure and gene responsible for its synthesis were all elucidated in the last two decades.

== Determining venom toxicity (LD_{50}) ==
Snake venom toxicity is assessed by a toxicological test called the median lethal dose, lethal dose 50% (abbreviated as LD_{50}), which determines the concentration of a toxin required to kill half the members of a tested population. The potency of wild snake venom varies considerably because of assorted influences such as biophysical environment, physiological status, ecological variables, genetic variation (either adaptive or incidental), and other molecular and ecological evolutionary factors. This is true even for members of one species. Such variation is smaller in captive populations in laboratory settings, though it cannot be eliminated. However, studies to determine snake venom potency must be designed to minimize variability.

Several techniques have been designed to this end. One approach is to use 0.1% bovine serum albumin (also known as "fraction V" in Cohn process) as a diluent in determining LD_{50} values. It results in more accurate and consistent LD_{50} determinations than using 0.1% saline as a diluent. For example, fraction V produces about 95% purified albumin (dried crude venom). Saline as a diluent consistently produces widely varying LD_{50} results for nearly all venomous snakes. It produces unpredictable variation in precipitate purity (35-60%). Fraction V is structurally stable because it has seventeen disulfide bonds; it's unique in that it has the highest solubility and lowest isoelectric point of major plasma proteins. This makes it the final fraction to be precipitated from its solution. Bovine serum albumin is located in fraction V. The precipitation of albumin is done by reducing the pH to 4.8, near the pH of the proteins, and maintaining the ethanol concentration at 40%, with a protein concentration of 1%. Thus, only 1% of the original plasma remains in the fifth fraction.

When the ultimate goal of plasma processing is a purified plasma component for injection or transfusion, the plasma component must be highly pure. The first practical large-scale method of blood plasma fractionation was developed by Edwin J. Cohn during World War II. it's known as the Cohn process (or Cohn method). This process is also known as cold ethanol fractionation, as it involves gradually increasing the concentration of ethanol in the solution at 5 °C and 3 °C. The Cohn Process exploits differences in plasma proteins properties, specifically, the high solubility and low pI of albumin. As the ethanol concentration is increased in stages from 0 to 40%, the pH declines from neutral (pH ~ 7) to about 4.8, which is near the pI of albumin. At each stage, proteins are precipitated out of the solution and removed. The final precipitate is purified albumin. Several variations to this process exist, including an adapted method by Nitschmann and Kistler that uses fewer steps, and replaces centrifugation and bulk freezing with filtration and diafiltration. Some newer methods of albumin purification add additional purification steps to the Cohn process and its variations. Chromatographic albumin processing emerged in the 1980s, however, it was not widely adopted until later due to the scarity of large-scale chromatography equipment. Methods incorporating chromatography generally begin with cryo-depleted plasma undergoing buffer exchange via either diafiltration or buffer exchange chromatography, to prepare the plasma for following ion exchange chromatography steps. After ion exchange, generally purification steps and buffer exchange occur.

However, chromatographic methods began to be adopted in the 1980s. Developments were ongoing between when Cohn fractionation started emerge in 1946, and when chromatography emerged, in 1983. In 1962, the Kistler and Nistchmann process was created as a spin-off of the Cohn process. In the 1990s, the Zenalb and the CSL Albumex processes were created, which incorporated chromatography with variations. The general approach to using chromatography for plasma fractionation for albumin is: recovery of supernatant I, delipidation, anion exchange chromatography, cation exchange chromatography, and gel filtration chromatography. The recovered purified material is formulated with combinations of sodium octanoate and sodium N-acetyl tryptophanate and then subjected to viral inactivation procedures, including pasteurization at 60 °C. This is a more efficient alternative than the Cohn process because:

- smooth automation and a relatively inexpensive plant was needed,
- easier to sterilize equipment and maintain a good manufacturing environment
- chromatographic processes are less damaging to the albumin protein
- a more successful albumin result can be achieved.

Compared with the Cohn process, albumin purity increased from about 95% to 98% using chromatography, and the yield increased from about 65% to 85%. Small percentage increases make a difference in regard to sensitive measurements such as purity. The big drawback has to do with the economics. Although the method offered efficient, acquiring the necessary equipment was difficult. Large machinery is necessary, and for a long time, the lack of equipment availability limited its widespread use.

== Evolution ==
Venom evolved just once among all Toxicofera about 170 million years ago, and then diversified into the huge venom diversity seen today. The original toxicoferan venom was a very simple set of proteins that were assembled in a pair of glands. Subsequently, this set of proteins evolved independently in the various lineages of toxicoferans, including Serpentes, Anguimorpha, and Iguania. Several snake lineages have since lost the ability to produce venom, often due to a change in diet or a change in predatory tactics. In addition to this, venom strength and composition has changed due to changes in the prey of certain snake species. For example, the venom of the marbled sea snake (Aipysurus eydouxii) became significantly less toxic after the diet of this species changed from fish to strictly fish eggs. The evolution of venom is thought to be responsible for the enormous expansion of snakes across the globe.

The mechanism of evolution in most cases has been gene duplication in tissues unrelated to the venom. Pre-existing salivary proteins are the likely ancestors of most venom toxin genes. Expression of the new protein in the venom gland followed duplication. Then proceeded natural selection for adaptive traits following the birth-and-death model, where duplication is followed by functional diversification, resulting in the creation of structurally related proteins that have slightly different functions. The study of venom evolution has been a high priority for scientists in terms of scientific research, due to the medical relevance of snake venom, in terms of making antivenom and cancer research. Knowing more about the composition of venom and the ways it can potentially evolve is very beneficial. Three main factors that affect venom evolution have been closely studied: predators of the snake that are resistant to snake venom, prey that are in an evolutionary arms race with snakes, and the specific diets that affect the intraspecific evolution of venom. Venoms continue to evolve as specific toxins and are modified to target a specific prey, and toxins are found to vary according to diet in some species.

Rapid venom evolution can also be explained by the arms race between venom-targeted molecules in resistant predators, such as the opossum, and the snake venom that targets the molecules. Scientists performed experiments on the opossums and found that multiple trials showed replacement to silent substitutions in the von Willebrand factor (vWf) gene that encodes for a venom-targeted hemostatic blood protein. These substitutions are thought to weaken the connection between vWf and a toxic snake venom ligand (botrocetin), which changes the net charge and hydrophobicity. These results are significant to the venom evolution because it's the first citation of rapid evolution in a venom-targeted molecule. This shows that an evolutionary arms race may be occurring in terms of defensive purposes. Alternative hypotheses suggest that venom evolution is due to trophic adaption, whereas these scientists believe, in this case, that selection would occur on traits that help with prey survival in terms of venom evolution instead of predation success. Several other predators of the pit viper (mongooses and hedgehogs) show the same type of relationship between snakes, which helps to support the hypothesis that venom has a very strong defensive role along with a trophic role. Which in turn supports the idea that predation on the snakes can be the arms race that produces snake venom evolution.

Some of the various adaptations produced by this process include venom more toxic to specific prey in several lineages, proteins that pre-digest prey, as well as a method to track down prey after a bite. Though venom function has evolved to be specific to prey class (e.g. particular coagulatory effects), the evolution of broad toxicological effects (e.g. neurotoxicity or coagulotoxicity) does not appear to be broadly affected by prey type. The presence of digestive enzymes in snake venom was once believed to be an adaptation to assist digestion. However, studies of the western diamondback rattlesnake (Crotalus atrox), a snake with highly proteolytic venom, show that venom has no impact on the time required for food to pass through the gut. These various adaptations of venom have also led to considerable debate about the definition of venom and venomous snakes.

== Injection ==
=== Vipers ===
In vipers, which have the most highly developed venom-delivery apparatus, the venom gland is very large and is surrounded by the masseter or temporal muscle, which consists of two bands, the superior arising from behind the eye, the inferior extending from the gland to the mandible. A duct carries venom from the gland to the fang. In vipers and elapids, this groove is completely closed, forming a hypodermic needle-like tube. In other species, the grooves are not covered, or only partially covered. From the anterior extremity of the gland, the duct passes below the eye and above the maxillary bone, to the basal orifice of the venom fang, which is ensheathed in a thick fold of mucous membrane. By means of the movable maxillary bone hinged to the prefrontal bone and connected with the transverse bone, which is pushed forward by muscles set in action by the opening of the mouth, the fang is erected and the venom discharged through the distal orifice. When the snake bites, the jaws close and the muscles surrounding the gland contract, causing venom to be ejected via the fangs.

=== Elapids ===
In the proteroglyphous elapids, the fangs are tubular, but are short and do not possess the mobility seen in vipers.

=== Colubrids ===
Opisthoglyphous colubrids have enlarged, grooved teeth situated at the posterior extremity of the maxilla, where a small posterior portion of the upper labial or salivary gland produces venom.

=== Mechanics of biting ===
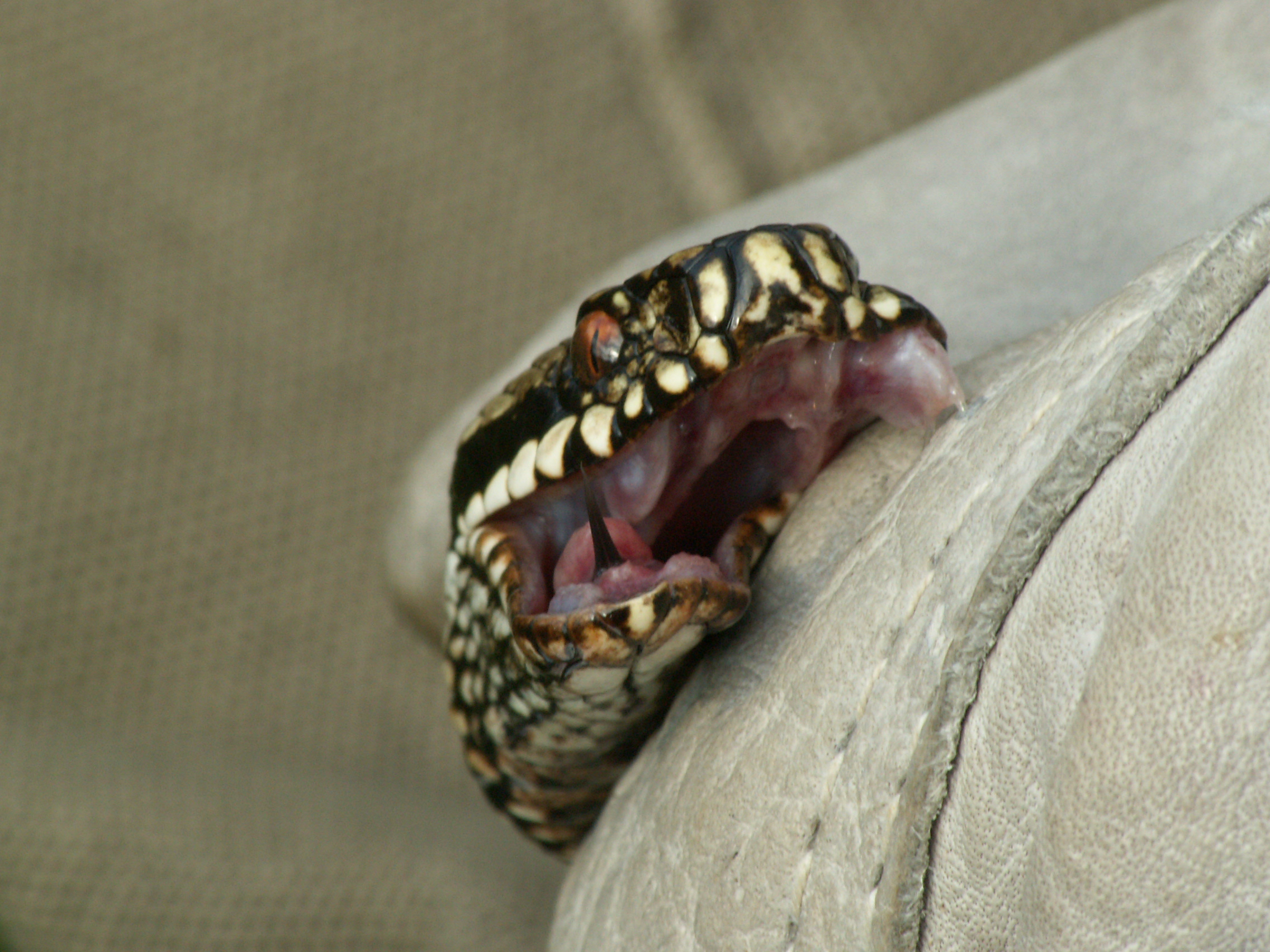
European adder (Vipera berus), one fang with a small venom stain in glove, the other still in place

Several genera, including Asian coral snakes (Calliophis), burrowing asps (Atractaspis), and night adders (Causus), are remarkable for having exceptionally long venom glands, extending along each side of the body, in some cases extending posterially as far as the heart. Instead of the muscles of the temporal region serving to press out the venom into the duct, this action is performed by those of the side of the body.

Considerable variability in biting behavior is seen among snakes. When biting, viperid snakes often strike quickly, discharging venom as the fangs penetrate the skin, and then immediately release. Alternatively, as in the case of a feeding response, some viperids (e.g. Lachesis) bite and hold. A proteroglyph or opisthoglyph may close its jaws and bite or chew firmly for a considerable time.

Differences in fang length between the various venomous snakes are likely due to the evolution of different striking strategies. Additionally, it has been shown that the fangs of different species of venomous snakes have different sizes and shapes depending on the biomechanical properties of the snake's prey.

=== Mechanics of spitting ===
Spitting cobras of the genera Naja and Hemachatus, when irritated or threatened, may eject streams or a spray of venom a distance of 1.2 metres (4 ft) to 2.4 metres (8 ft). These snakes' fangs have been modified for the purposes of spitting; inside the fangs, the channel makes a 90° bend to the lower front of the fang. Spitters may spit repeatedly and still be able to deliver a fatal bite.

Spitting is a defensive reaction only. The snakes tend to aim for the eyes of a perceived threat. A direct hit can cause temporary shock and blindness through severe inflammation of the cornea and conjunctiva. Although usually no serious symptoms result if the venom is washed away immediately with plenty of water, blindness can become permanent if left untreated. Brief contact with the skin is not immediately dangerous, but open wounds may be vectors for envenomation.

== Physiological effects ==
The five distinct types of venom act on the body differently:

- Proteolytic venom dismantles the molecular surroundings, including at the site of the bite.
- Hemotoxic venom acts on the cardiovascular system, including the heart and blood.
- Neurotoxic venom acts on the nervous system, including the brain.
- Cytotoxic venom has a localized action at the site of the bite.
- Myotoxic venom acts on the muscular system.

=== Proteroglyphous snakes ===
The effect of the venom of proteroglyphous snakes (sea snakes, kraits, mambas, black snakes, tiger snakes, and death adders) is mainly on the nervous system, respiratory paralysis being quickly produced by bringing the venom into contact with the central nervous mechanism that controls respiration; the pain and local swelling that follow a bite are not usually severe. The bite of all the proteroglyphous elapids, even of the smallest and gentlest, such as the coral snakes, is, so far as known, deadly to humans. However, some mildly venomous elapids remain, such as the hooded snakes (Parasuta), bandy-bandies (Vermicella), etc.

=== Vipers ===
Viper venom (Russell's viper, saw-scaled vipers, bushmasters, and rattlesnakes) acts more on the vascular system, bringing about coagulation of the blood and clotting of the pulmonary arteries; its action on the nervous system is not great, no individual group of nerve-cells appears to be picked out, and the effect upon respiration is not so direct; the influence upon the circulation explains the great depression, which is a symptom of viperine envenomation. The pain of the wound is severe and is rapidly followed by swelling and discoloration. The symptoms produced by the bite of the European vipers are thus described by Martin and Lamb:

The bite is immediately followed by the local pain of a burning character; the limb soon swells and becomes discolored, and within one to three hours great prostration, accompanied by vomiting, and often diarrhea, sets in. Cold, clammy perspiration is usual. The pulse becomes extremely feeble, and slight dyspnoea and restlessness may be seen. In severe cases, which occur mostly in children, the pulse may become imperceptible and the extremities cold; the patient may pass into coma. In from twelve to twenty-four hours these severe constitutional symptoms usually pass off; but in the meantime, the swelling and discoloration have spread enormously. The limb becomes phlegmonous and occasionally suppurates. Within a few days recovery usually occurs somewhat suddenly, but death may result from the severe depression or from the secondary effects of suppuration. That cases of death, in adults as well as in children, are not infrequent in some parts of the Continent is mentioned in the last chapter of this Introduction.

The Viperidae differ much among themselves in the toxicity of their venoms. Some, such as the Indian Russell's viper (Daboia russelli) and saw-scaled viper (E. carinatus); the American rattlesnakes (Crotalus spp.), bushmasters (Lachesis spp.), and lanceheads (Bothrops spp.); and the African adders (Bitis spp.), night adders (Causus spp.), and horned vipers (Cerastes spp.), cause fatal results unless a remedy is speedily applied. The bite of the larger European vipers may be very dangerous, and followed by fatal results, especially in children, at least in the hotter parts of the Continent; whilst the small meadow viper (Vipera ursinii), which hardly ever bites unless roughly handled, does not seem to be possessed of a very virulent venom, and although very common in some parts of Austria and Hungary, is not known to have ever caused a serious accident.

=== Opisthoglyphous colubrids ===
Biologists had long known that some snakes had rear fangs, 'inferior' venom injection mechanisms that might immobilize prey; although a few fatalities were on record, until 1957, the possibility that such snakes were deadly to humans seemed at most remote. The deaths of two prominent herpetologists, Robert Mertens and Karl Schmidt, from African colubrid bites, changed that assessment, and recent events reveal that several other species of rear-fanged snakes have venoms that are potentially lethal to large vertebrates.

Boomslang (Dispholidus typus) and twig snake (Thelotornis spp.) venoms are toxic to blood cells and thin the blood (hemotoxic, hemorrhagic). Early symptoms include headaches, nausea, diarrhea, lethargy, mental disorientation, bruising, and bleeding at the site and all body openings. Exsanguination is the main cause of death from such a bite.

The boomslang's venom is the most potent of all rear-fanged snakes in the world based on LD_{50}. Although its venom may be more potent than some vipers and elapids, it causes fewer fatalities owing to various factors (for example, the fangs' effectiveness is not high compared with many other snakes, the venom dose delivered is low, and boomslangs are generally less aggressive in comparison to other venomous snakes such as cobras and mambas). Symptoms of a bite from these snakes include nausea and internal bleeding, and one could die from a brain hemorrhage and respiratory collapse.

=== Aglyphous snakes ===
Experiments made with the secretion of the parotid gland of Rhabdophis and Zamenis have shown that even aglyphous snakes are not entirely devoid of venom, and point to the conclusion that the physiological difference between so-called harmless and venomous snakes is only one of degree, just as various steps exist in the transformation of an ordinary parotid gland into a venom gland or of a solid tooth into a tubular or grooved fang.

== Use of snake venoms to treat disease ==
Given that snake venom contains many biologically active ingredients, some may be useful to treat disease.

For instance, phospholipases type A2 (PLA2s) from the Tunisian vipers Cerastes cerastes and Macrovipera lebetina have been found to have antitumor activity. Anticancer activity has been also reported for other compounds in snake venom. PLA2s hydrolyze phospholipids, thus could act on bacterial cell surfaces, providing novel antimicrobial (antibiotic) activities.

The analgesic (pain-killing) activity of many snake venom proteins has been long known. The main challenge, however, is how to deliver protein to the nerve cells: proteins usually are not applicable as pills.

== Immunity ==
=== Among snakes ===
The question whether individual snakes are immune to their own venom has not yet been definitively settled, though an example is known of a cobra that self-envenomated, resulting in a large abscess requiring surgical intervention, but showing none of the other effects that would have proven rapidly lethal in prey species or humans. Furthermore, certain harmless species, such as the North American common kingsnake (Lampropeltis getula) and the Central and South American mussurana (Clelia spp.), are proof against the venom of the crotalines, which frequent the same districts, and which they are able to overpower and feed upon. The chicken snake (Spilotes pullatus) is the enemy of the fer-de-lance (Bothrops caribbaeus) in St. Lucia, and in their encounters, the chicken snake is invariably the victor. Repeated experiments have shown the European grass snake (Natrix natrix) not to be affected by the bite of the European adder (Vipera berus) and the European asp (Vipera aspis), this being due to the presence, in the blood of the harmless snake, of toxic principles secreted by the parotid and labial glands, and analogous to those of the venom of these vipers. Several North American species of rat snakes, as well as king snakes, have proven to be immune or highly resistant to the venom of rattlesnake species. The king cobra, which does prey on cobras, is said to be immune to their venom.

=== Among other animals ===
The hedgehog (Erinaceidae), the mongoose (Herpestidae), the honey badger (Mellivora capensis) and the opossum are known to be resistant to a dose of snake venom. Recently, the honey badger and domestic pig were found to have convergently evolved amino-acid replacements in their nicotinic acetylcholine receptor, which are known to confer resistance to alpha-neurotoxins in hedgehogs. Whether the pig may be considered immune is still uncertain, though early studies show endogenous resistance in pigs tested against neurotoxins. Though the pig's subcutaneous layer of fat may protect it against snake venom, most venoms pass easily through vascular fat layers, making this unlikely to contribute to its ability to resist venoms. The garden dormouse (Eliomys quercinus) has recently been added to the list of animals refractory to viper venom. Some populations of California ground squirrel (Otospermophilus beecheyi) are at least partially immune to rattlesnake venom as adults.

=== Among humans ===
The acquisition of human immunity against snake venom is ancient (from around 60 CE, Psylli tribe). Research into development of vaccines that will lead to immunity is ongoing. Bill Haast, owner and director of the Miami Serpentarium, injected himself with snake venom during most of his adult life, in an effort to build up an immunity to a broad array of venomous snakes, in a practice known as mithridatism. Haast lived to age 100, and survived a reported 172 snake bites. He donated his blood to be used in treating snake-bite patients when a suitable antivenom was not available. More than 20 so-treated individuals recovered. Amateur researcher Tim Friede also lets venomous snakes bite him in the hopes of a vaccine against snake venom being developed, and has survived over 650 bites from different species as of May 2025. Researchers reported 856 documented self-immunizations by him over an 18 year period. Scientists identified multiple antibodies in Friede's blood that are capable of neutralizing venom from multiple snake species, and are hopeful that these may be used to produce a universal antivenom.

== Traditional treatments ==
The World Health Organization estimates that 80% of the world's population depends on traditional medicine for their primary health-care needs. Methods of traditional treatments of snakebites, although of questionable efficacy and perhaps even harmful, are nonetheless relevant.

Plants used to treat snakebites in Trinidad and Tobago are made into tinctures with alcohol or olive oil and kept in rum flasks called snake bottles, which contain several different plants and/or insects. The plants used include the vine called monkey ladder (Bauhinia cumanensis or Bauhinia excisa, Fabaceae), which is pounded and put on the bite. Alternatively, a tincture is made with a piece of the vine and kept in a snake bottle. Other plants used include mat root (Aristolochia rugosa), cat's claw (Pithecellobim unguis-cati), tobacco (Nicotiana tabacum), snake bush (Barleria lupulina), obie seed (Cola nitida), and wild gri gri root (Acrocomia aculeata). Some snake bottles also contain the caterpillars (Battus polydamas, Papilionidae) that eat tree leaves (Aristolochia trilobata). Emergency snake medicines are obtained by chewing a three-inch piece of the root of bois canôt (Cecropia peltata) and administering this chewed-root solution to the bitten subject (usually a hunting dog). This is a common native plant of Latin America and the Caribbean, which makes it appropriate as an emergency remedy. Another native plant used is mardi gras (Renealmia alpinia) (berries), which are crushed together with the juice of wild cane (Costus scaber) and given to the bitten. Quick fixes have included applying chewed tobacco from cigarettes, cigars, or pipes. Making cuts around the puncture or sucking out the venom had been thought helpful in the past, but this course of treatment is now strongly discouraged, due to the risk of self-envenomation through knife cuts or cuts in the mouth (suction cups from snake bite kits can be used, but suctioning seldom provides any measurable benefit).

=== Serotherapy ===
Serotherapy using antivenom is a common current treatment and has been described back in 1913. (Note: This section is based on the 1913 book The Snakes of Europe, by G. A. Boulenger, which is now in the public domain in the United States (and possibly elsewhere) Because of its age, the text in this article should not necessarily be viewed as reflecting the current knowledge of snake venom) Both adaptive immunity and serotherapy are specific to the type of snake; venom with identical physiological action do not cross-neutralize. Boulenger 1913 describes the following cases:

A European in Australia who had become immune to the venom of the deadly Australian tiger snake (Notechis scutatus), manipulating these snakes with impunity, and was under the impression that his immunity extended also to other species, when bitten by a lowland copperhead (Austrelaps superbus), an allied elapine, died the following day.

In India, the serum prepared with the venom of monocled cobra Naja kaouthia has been found to be without effect on the venom of two species of kraits (Bungarus), Russell's viper (Daboia russelli), saw-scaled viper (Echis carinatus), and Pope's pit viper (Trimeresurus popeiorum). Russell's viper serum is without effect on colubrine venoms, or those of Echis and Trimeresurus.

In Brazil, serum prepared with the venom of lanceheads (Bothrops spp.) is without action on rattlesnake (Crotalus spp.) venom.

Antivenom snakebite treatment must be matched as the type of envenomation that has occurred. In the Americas, polyvalent antivenoms are available that are effective against the bites of most pit vipers. Crofab is the antivenom developed to treat the bite of North American pit vipers. These are not effective against coral snake envenomation, which requires a specific antivenom to their neurotoxic venom. The situation is even more complex in countries such as India, with its rich mix of vipers (Viperidae) and highly neurotoxic cobras and kraits of the Elapidae.

== See also ==
- Antivenom
- Venomoid
- Snakebite
- Toxicofera
