= Atrolysin A =

Identifiers
- EC no.: 3.4.24.1
- CAS no.: 37288-82-7

Databases
- BRENDA: enzyme data
- ExPASy: NiceZyme view
- KEGG: enzyme entry
- MetaCyc: metabolic pathway
- Rhea: reactions
- PDB structures: RCSB PDB PDBe PDBsum
Search
- PMC: articles
- PubMed: articles
- NCBI: proteins

Zinc metalloproteinase-disintegrin-like atrolysin-A

Identifiers
- Organism: Crotalus atrox
- Symbol: N/A
- CAS number: 37288-82-7
- Orthologs: OMA: entry
- UniProt: Q92043

Other data
- EC number: 3.4.24.1
Search for
- Structures: Swiss-model
- Domains: InterPro

Atrolysin A (EC 3.4.24.1) is an enzyme that is one of six hemorrhagic toxins found in the venom of western diamondback rattlesnake. This endopeptidase has a length of 419 amino acid residues. The metalloproteinase disintegrin-like domain and the cysteine-rich domain of the enzyme are responsible for the enzyme's hemorrhagic effects on organisms via inhibition of platelet aggregation.

This enzyme catalyzes the following chemical reactions:

- cleavage of peptide bonds between amino acid residues Asn^{3}-Gln^{4}, His^{5}-Leu^{6}, His^{10}-Leu^{11}, Ala^{14}-Leu^{15} and Tyr^{16}-Leu^{17} in the insulin B chain
- removal of the C-terminal Leu from small peptides

== Nomenclature ==
The accepted name for this enzyme is Atrolysin A. The enzyme is also known by:

- Crotalus atrox metalloendopeptidase a,
- Crotalus atrox α-proteinase,
- Crotalus atrox proteinase,
- bothropasin, and
- hemorrhagic toxin a

== Structure ==
The amino acid sequence of atrolysin A is 419 sequences long, and contains ten calcium binding sites between positions 9 and 225, three of which are catalytic histidine residues at positions 142, 146, and 152. There are also three positions (142, 146, 152) that are used for binding with the enzyme's cofactor, zinc. The active site lies at position 143.

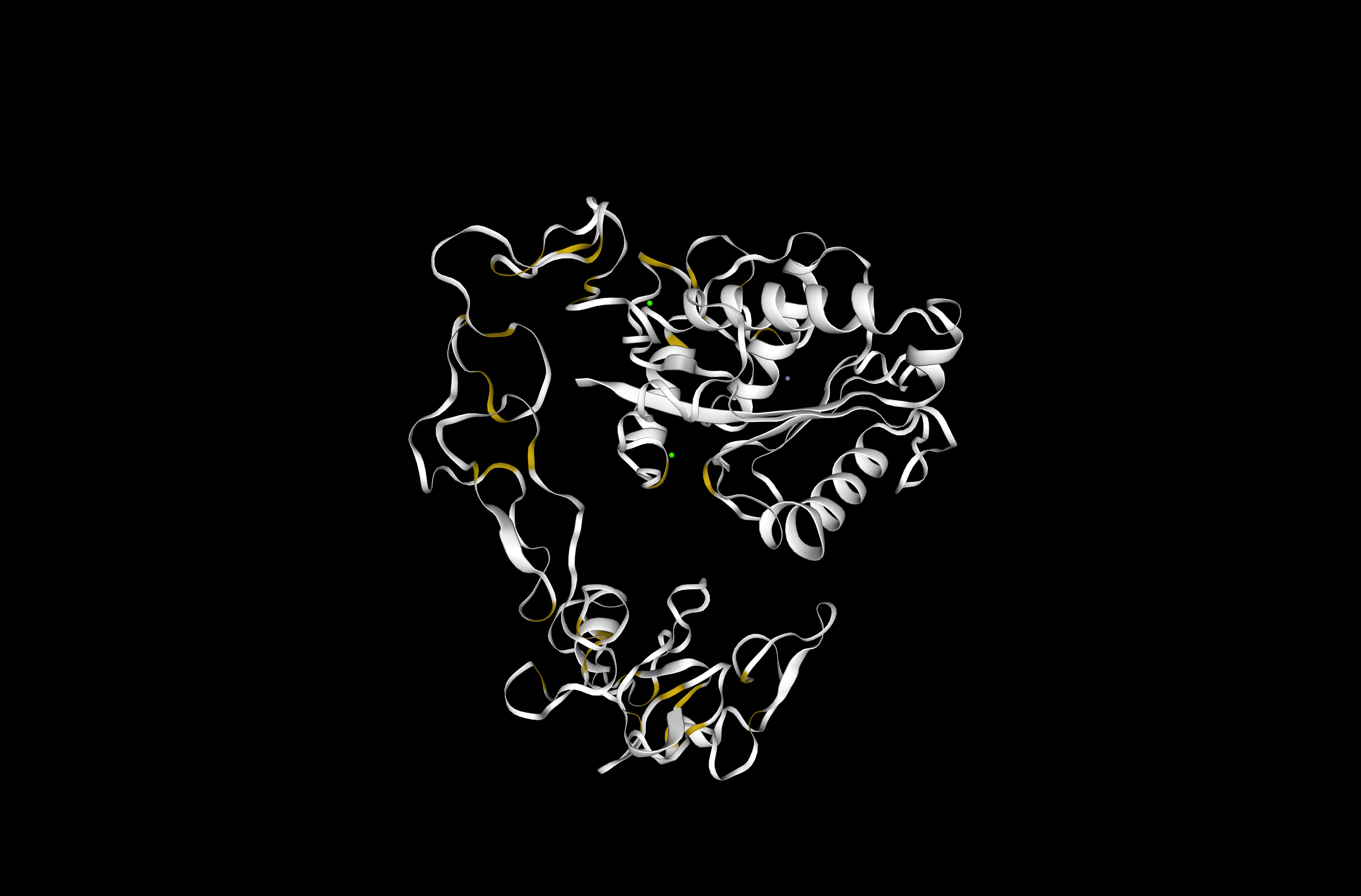
3D rendering of the atrolysin A protein from SWISS-MODEL. The gold bands represent cysteine. The green spheres represent calcium ions at their binding sites, while the purple sphere represents the enzyme's cofactor, zinc, at its binding site.

A significant portion of the protein from position 1-190 consists of alpha-helical structures with two shorted helixes between positions 315-340. There are 39 observed disulfide bonds in the protein, all but one of these disulfide bonds occur between positions 157-409. Research suggests that the RSECD cysteine residue at positions 272-276 must be involved in a disulfide bond for the enzyme to have an inhibitory effect on platelet aggregation.

The protein contains the following three domains:

- N-terminal Reprolysin (M12B) family zinc metalloprotease domain, followed by a
- disintegrin domain (containing a RSECD sequence analogous to RGD motif), and finally a
- C-terminal ADAM (A Disintegrin-like and Metalloproteinase) cysteine-rich domain.

== Mechanisms of action ==
The metalloproteinase disintegrin-like domain has shown an ability to degrade sub-endothelial matrix proteins such as type IV collagen, and fibronectin which is partially responsible for the hemorrhage caused by the toxin

The cysteine-rich domain binds to the alpha-2/beta-1 integrin and causes inhibition of the platelet aggregation pathways that collagen is responsible for. The glycoprotein VI (GPVI) collagen receptor however, does not seem affected by atrolysin A or other snake venom metalloproteinases (SVMP ). Other agonists for platelet formation and aggregation such as adenosine diphosphate (ADP) or pathways mediated by convulxin also do not seem inhibited by the toxin in most organisms. The cysteine-rich domain was shown to have two sequences that cause an interaction which prevents alpha-2/beta-1 integrin expressing K562 cells and platelets from binding to collagen.

This enzyme may have the potential to inhibit platelet formation with certain pathways that were previously determined that the toxin had no effect on. For example, ADP stimulated aggregation appears to be inhibited by atrolysin A in a study where insect cells were used to express the protein, and the protein was inserted into human blood. When this variant of the protein was inserted into human blood, ADP stimulated platelet aggregation was inhibited. This form of platelet aggregation does not appear inhibited by atrolysin A in other studies. This suggests that there may be an interaction between the disintegrin-like domain, and cysteine-rich domain of atrolysin A and fibrinogen receptor alpha-2b/beta-3 as well as the collagen receptor.

== Isozymes ==
Other atrolysin isozymes (A-F) have been further studied to understand potential methods of treatment against SVMPs. Research has been conducted on the use of medications to treat other diseases such as arthritis, and tumor metastasis as well.

- Atrolysin B
- Atrolysin C
- Atrolysin D
- Atrolysin E
- Atrolysin F
