= Tim Friede =

American snake collector

Timothy Friede (born c. 1968) is an American mechanic and snake collector who intentionally exposed himself to various forms of snake venom in order to acquire immunity. A lifelong enthusiast of snakes, he began injecting himself with snake venom in 2000 after taking a venom extraction class. After being bitten by two cobras on the same night in 2001 and being left comatose for four days, he resolved to develop an advanced immunity to a variety of snakebites, amassing a collection of over sixty snakes and teaching himself immunology. He injected himself with snake venom over 800 times, and was bitten around 200.

After receiving perennial media attention over the 2000s and 2010s, he was contacted by immunologist and biotechnology researcher Jacob Glanville, who saw his acquired resistance as crucial to the development of a broad-spectrum snake antivenom. In a 2025 study published in Cell, two of these antibodies, combined with the anti-inflammatory agent varespladib, proved effective in countering thirteen out of nineteen venoms in a sample of nineteen snake venoms, and was partially effective against the remaining six. He works as the director of herpetology at Glanville's biotechnology company, Centivax.

== Biography ==
Timothy Friede was born around 1968. He was adopted when he was three months old, and spent his childhood living in a suburb around Milwaukee. He had a lifelong interest in snakes, and was first bitten by a harmless garter snake when he was five years old. In high school, he frequently hunted garter snakes in rural Wisconsin, and acquired a snake as a pet. Initially planning to join the United States military, he fractured his ankle at an Army boot camp when he was 19, and instead took up a job as a window-washer for high-rise buildings in Milwaukee. He later got a job working in construction.

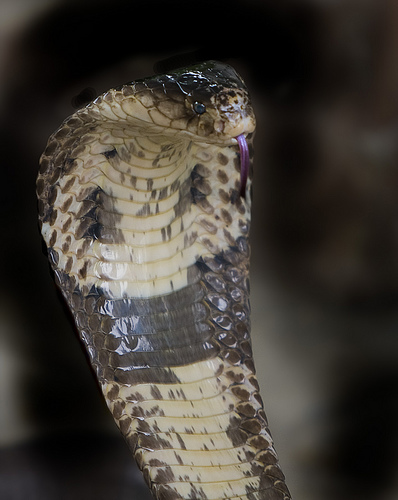
A bite from a monocled cobra, received shortly after another cobra bite, left Friede comatose for several days.

When Friede was 30, he enrolled in a venom extraction class, learning how to milk venom from spiders and scorpions. After acquiring a copperhead as a pet in 2000, he became interested in self-immunization to snake bites, and began injecting himself with small amounts of venom extracted from his snakes. He amassed a large collection of snakes, at one point housing over sixty in his basement. On September 12, 2001, drunk and distracted by the recent death of a family friend, he was bitten by two different snakes; an Egyptian cobra bit one of his fingers while he was milking it, although he was little-affected due to his prior injections of cobra venom. He was bitten by a monocled cobra in his bicep an hour later, leaving him temporarily paralyzed. Rushed to the hospital by his wife and his neighbor, he was revived with antivenom acquired from a local zoo, and awoke from a coma four days later.

After the incident, Friede aimed to be able to survive two venomous snakebites in one night without requiring antivenom. He taught himself immunology, using Stanley Plotkin's textbook Vaccines as a guide, and became more methodical with his venom injections, using carefully measured and timed doses. These practices frequently resulted in side effects such as anaphylactic shocks, allergic reactions, and blackouts. Over the following 18 years, he injected himself with venom over 800 times, and was bitten around 200. He was bitten by various deadly species such as coastal taipans, water cobras, diamondback rattlesnakes, mojave rattlesnakes, and all four species of mamba.

He began to receive perennial media attention; he was interviewed by National Geographic in 2002, and was featured on an episode of Stan Lee's Superhumans in 2010. He began to film videos of himself being bit by snakes, which attracted considerable attention on YouTube and Facebook. He became a major figure within an emerging self-immunization hobbyist community which organized on Facebook. Friede's intense interest in self-immunization created tensions with his wife and children, and he separated from his wife in 2010. He moved his laboratory to a property in Fond du Lac, Wisconsin, where he slept in a tent.

=== Contributions to antivenom ===
Friede had believed since 2003 that his blood could be used to create an antivenom, but did not initially find interest among immunologists he contacted. He began to be disillusioned with the self-immunization practice by the mid-2010s. By 2017, he worked building military trucks in Oshkosh, Wisconsin, when he was contacted by immunologist Jacob Glanville, an antivenom researcher, who had discovered Friede through a newspaper story about his YouTube videos and felt that he could be instrumental in developing a general-purpose snake antivenom. Friede agreed to supply Glanville with his blood for antibodies, agreeing to split any profits from a resulting antivenom equally.

Glanville and Columbia University vaccine researcher Peter Kwong isolated broadly neutralizing antibodies against three-finger toxins from Friede's blood. In a 2025 study published in Cell, two of these antibodies, combined with the secretory phospholipase A2 (another common class of snake venom toxin) inhibitor varespladib, proved effective in countering thirteen out of nineteen venoms in a sample of nineteen elapid venoms, and was partially effective against the remaining six. It offers no resistance to viper venom, which operate using a different mechanism (metalloproteinase) to attack tissues and the cardiovascular system.

Friede stopped injecting himself with venom and getting bit by snakes, receiving his last bite from a water cobra in November 2018. He became the director of herpetology at Glanville's California-based biotechnology company, Centivax. The development of a broad-spectrum antivenom would likely allow Centivax to control large portions of the antivenom industry, which is currently split between several dozen antivenoms which target specific species.
