= Bothropasin =

Identifiers
- EC no.: 3.4.24.49
- CAS no.: 84788-89-6

Databases
- IntEnz: IntEnz view
- BRENDA: BRENDA entry
- ExPASy: NiceZyme view
- KEGG: KEGG entry
- MetaCyc: metabolic pathway
- PRIAM: profile
- PDB structures: RCSB PDB PDBe PDBsum
Search
- PMC: articles
- PubMed: articles
- NCBI: proteins

Bothropasin (EC 3.4.24.49, Bothrops jararaca venom metalloproteinase) is an enzyme. This enzyme catalyses the following chemical reaction

Cleavage of His^{5}-Leu, His^{10}-Leu, Ala^{14}-Leu, Tyr^{16}-Leu and Phe^{24}-Phe in insulin B chain

This endopeptidase is present in the venom of jararaca snake (Bothrops jararaca).

== See also ==
- Atrolysin A
