= Crotoxin =

Main toxic compound of rattlesnake venom

Crotoxin (CTX) is the main toxic compound in the snake venom of the South American rattlesnake, Crotalus durissus terrificus. Crotoxin is a heterodimeric beta-neurotoxin, composed of an acidic, non-toxic and non-enzymatic subunit (CA), and a basic, weakly toxic, phospholipase A2 protein (CB). This neurotoxin causes paralysis by both pre- and postsynaptic blocking of acetylcholine signalling.

== History ==
Crotoxin was identified in 1938 by researchers of the Department of Chemistry of the Instituto Butantan in São Paulo. The compound was first purified from the venom of Crotalus d. terrificus. These researchers found that 60 per cent of the venom consisted of a neurotoxic substance, later referred to as crotoxin.

Crotoxin was the first proteinic toxin to be crystallized (Protein crystallization). The first publication of this discovery showed that the toxin worked with two elements, a toxic and a coagulating principle. Later it was discovered that the crotoxin protein is not homogeneous, but consists of two subunits. The toxic effect of crotoxin is determined mainly by the phospholipase A2 action of CB. The CA subunit is non-enzymatic and non-toxic, but has blood coagulating functions (Coagulation), now known as crotapotin. Since 1966 until today, investigations into pharmacological applications for crotoxin are conducted.

== Structure and reactivity ==
The structure of crotoxin is composed by the components CA and CB in a 1:1 molecular ratio.܁CA is a nontoxic and non-enzymatic acidic protein while CB is the toxic component, a phospholipase A2 protein. Both components form a noncovalent heterodimeric complex (Protein dimer). It was found that isoforms (Protein isoform) of CA and CB can form at least 16 distinct CTX complexes.

=== The CA subunit ===
The CA protein is formed by three disulfide-bonded polypeptide chains: α, β and γ. Alpha-helices (Alpha helix) with loops at the terminal positions are formed by the α and β chains. The γ chain forms a disordered loop. Component CA is present in the heterodimeric complex to prevent the binding of the phospholipase A2 to nonspecific binding sites.

=== The CB subunit ===
The CB subunit is a phospholipase A2 protein. The C-terminal (C-terminus) of the CB subunit is important for the interaction between both subunits as it interacts with an alpha helix of CA. The CA subunit thereby blocks a part of the enzyme surface of phospholipase A2, resulting in an impossibility to be activated. This means the phospholipase A2 cannot adsorb onto a lipid/water interface from the cell membrane. Residues on the CB subunit which are involved in the enzyme surface and blocked by the CA subunit are F24 and F119, which are phenylalanine amino acids. It however was found that these residues are not part of the active site.

The interface between CA and CB is formed by three tryptophan amino acids which play an important role in the stability of the crotoxin complex.

=== Reactivity ===
The different isoforms of both subunits CA and CB can form crotoxin complexes which can be subdivided into two classes: moderately toxic with a high phospholipase A2 activity or more toxic with a lower enzymatic activity. The isoforms thereby also play a role in the stability of the crotoxin complex. Less toxic complexes are less stable while the more toxic complexes are more stable. The more toxic crotoxin complexes therefore dissociate more slowly than the less toxic ones. The relation between toxicity and enzyme activity is a result of the synergistic manner (Synergy) of action of both subunits. For this the CA subunit enhances the toxicity of the CB subunit while it reduces its enzyme activity and anticoagulant activity.

== Mechanism of action ==
The primary mechanistic action of crotoxin is twofold, a presynaptic and a postsynaptic action.

=== Presynaptic ===
The presynaptic acetylcholine secretion inhibition is caused by the phospholipase A2 activity of the CB subunit. The exact mechanism of presynaptic acetylcholine inhibition by Phospholipase A2 (PLA2) is not known. While the presynaptic effect is caused by the CB subunit, it is enhanced by the presence of the CA subunit.

=== Hypotheses ===
There are some hypotheses and models that try to explain the pharmacological effects of phospholipase A2 (PLA2) activity.

There is a hypothesis based on the damage that PLA2 does to membrane phospholipids via hydrolysis at the specific binding sites on exocytotically active parts of the membrane. This could lead to interference with the reabsorption of vesicles and the depletion of the acetylcholine store. Another hypothesis is based on the specific binding with receptors and proteins to create intracellular enzyme dependent and independent reactions. Membrane damage by the PLA2 activity allows PLA2 to enter cells and specifically bind to proteins and receptors either agonistic or antagonistic, inducing pharmacological effects non-enzymatically. The intracellular PLA2 could also remain enzymatically active and hydrolyze membrane phospholipids. This could lead to pharmacological effect by means of the damage to the membranes and membrane proteins, or by the lysophospholipids and fatty acids released in hydrolysis. The final hypothesis is based on the induced changes in Ca2+-concentrations in affected cells. The large changes in the Ca2+-concentrations interfere with many processes, including vesicle fusion and the mitochondrial membrane potential. Both these processes are important for acetylcholine homeostasis.

=== Postsynaptic ===
The second part of the mechanism of action of crotoxin is the postsynaptic part. Postsynaptic nicotinic acetylcholine receptors are blocked by the heterodimeric form of crotoxin. This blocking is achieved by a stabilization of the inactive form of the nicotinic acetylcholine receptors by the enzyme complex. Together with the presynaptic acetylcholine inhibition, this post synaptic effect can lead to paralysis of the affected muscles.

== Toxicity ==
Crotoxin has fatal neurotoxic effects, as the toxicity of CB is synergistically intensified by CA. Many people die of acute renal failure or acute respiratory failure. The latter is a result of muscle paralysis in the respiratory system. Low crotoxin levels produce an incomplete blockage of the acetylcholine receptor resulting in paresis, which is fully reversible. At higher doses, neuromuscular impairment is more severe. Also other cholinergic symptoms are common, especially at higher doses. Intramuscular injection of crotoxin further shows myotoxic effects. The intravenous LD50 (Median lethal dose) of native crotoxin is 0.096 μg/g in mice. It has been reported that mice can develop a tolerance to the toxin when they get increasing doses of crotoxin every day. They can eventually tolerate doses up to 35 times the LD50 without being intoxicated. Preclinical studies on human patients also show that toxicity signs decreased or disappeared when the patients were exposed to crotoxin over longer periods of time.

== Treatment ==
In Brazil, each year almost 2,000 snakebites are due to Crotalus durissus. The only treatment for people who are envenomed by C. durissus is a specifically developed antivenom that has to be injected intravenously. With the arrival of this antivenom, the fatality rate declined from 73% to 1.5%. The dosage of the antivenom varies between 10 and 20 ampules depending on the severity of the envenoming. However, the efficacy of the doses have not been clinically examined.

== Efficacy ==
Crotoxin in C. durissus venom is a potent neurotoxin, which also causes renal- and myotoxic effects. Except for its toxic effects, crotoxin also shows anti-inflammatory, immunomodulatory, anti-HIV and anti-tumor effects in human and animal models. Together with the fact that the body can build up tolerance to the toxic effects of crotoxin, these effects are of interest for pharmaceutical use.

== Pharmaceutical applications ==
As Crotoxin works as a neuromuscular blocker (Neuromuscular-blocking drug), some studies have already been conducted to investigate whether Crotoxin could function as a therapy for muscle tension problems. In one study, Crotoxin has shown to improve the ocular alignment of a group of cross-eyed patients after injection. The same study has also shown that it might help patients with blepharospasm. At low concentrations of crotoxin, patients with muscle dystonias show normal function. Therefore, it is proposed as a good alternative for botulinum toxin. Clinical research has shown that the crotoxin complex and isolated CB have antigenic characteristics, which can stimulate antibody production. Some studies have shown crotoxin to improve symptoms related to immune-associated disease and other conditions, including cancer. However, there are currently no NCI (National Cancer Institute) supported clinical trials studying crotoxin for cancer treatment.
