= Myotoxin =

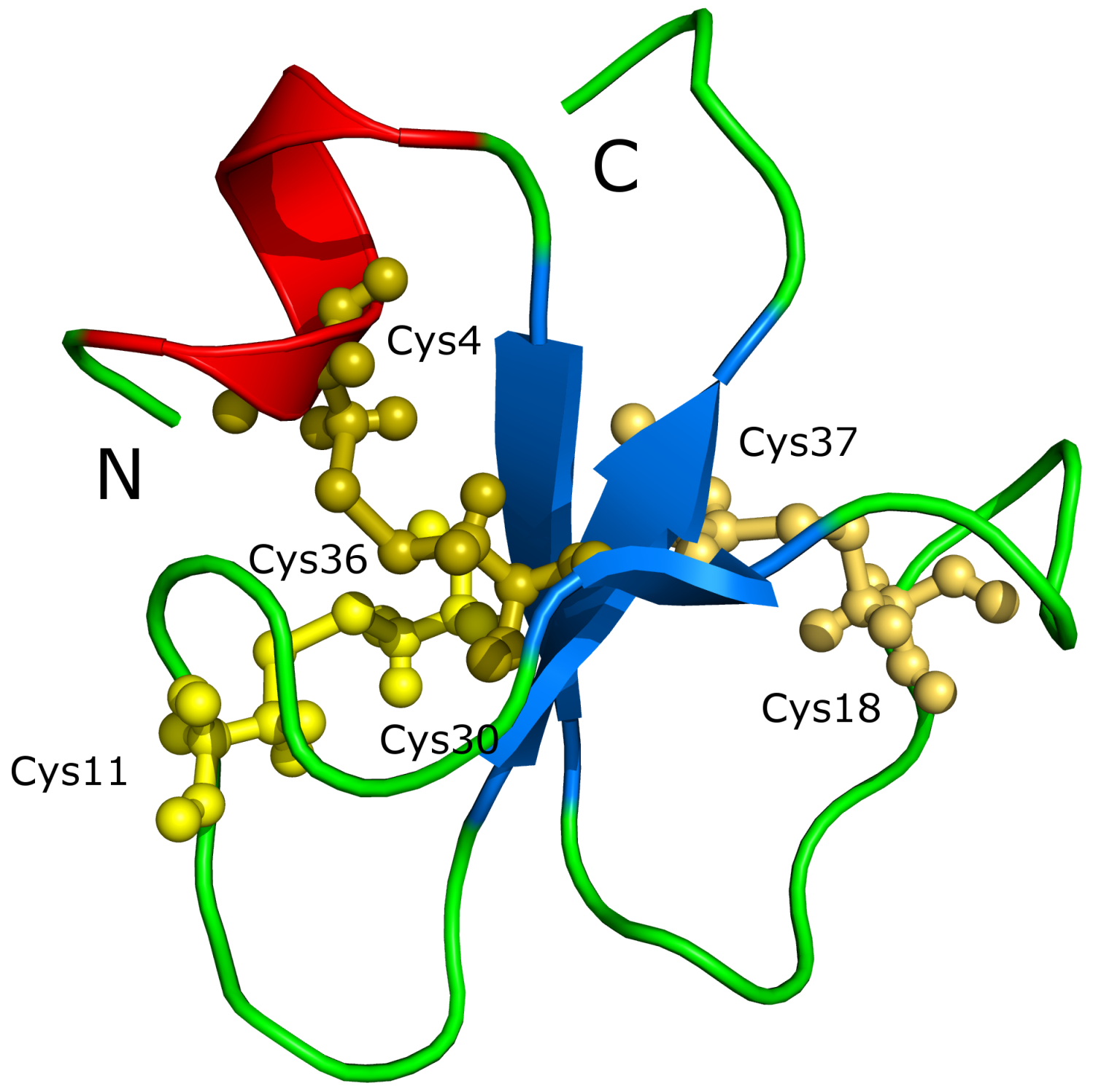
- Structure of crotamine, a Na+ channel affecting toxin from Crotalus durissus terrificus venom.

Identifiers
- Symbol: Myotoxins
- Pfam: PF00819
- InterPro: IPR000881
- PROSITE: PDOC00435
- SCOP2: 1h5o / SCOPe / SUPFAM
Available protein structures:
- Pfam: structures / ECOD
- PDB: RCSB PDB; PDBe; PDBj
- PDBsum: structure summary
- PDB: 1h5oA:1-42

Myotoxins are small, basic peptides found in snake venoms (e.g. rattlesnakes) and lizard venoms (e.g. Mexican beaded lizard). This involves a non-enzymatic mechanism that leads to severe muscle necrosis. These peptides act very quickly, causing instantaneous paralysis to prevent prey from escaping and eventually death due to diaphragmatic paralysis.

The first myotoxin to be identified and isolated was crotamine, from the venom of Crotalus durissus terrificus, a tropical South American rattlesnake, by Brazilian scientist José Moura Gonçalves, in the 1950s. Its biological actions, molecular structure and gene responsible for its synthesis were all elucidated in the last two decades.
