= Mucrocetin =

mucrocetin, subunit A
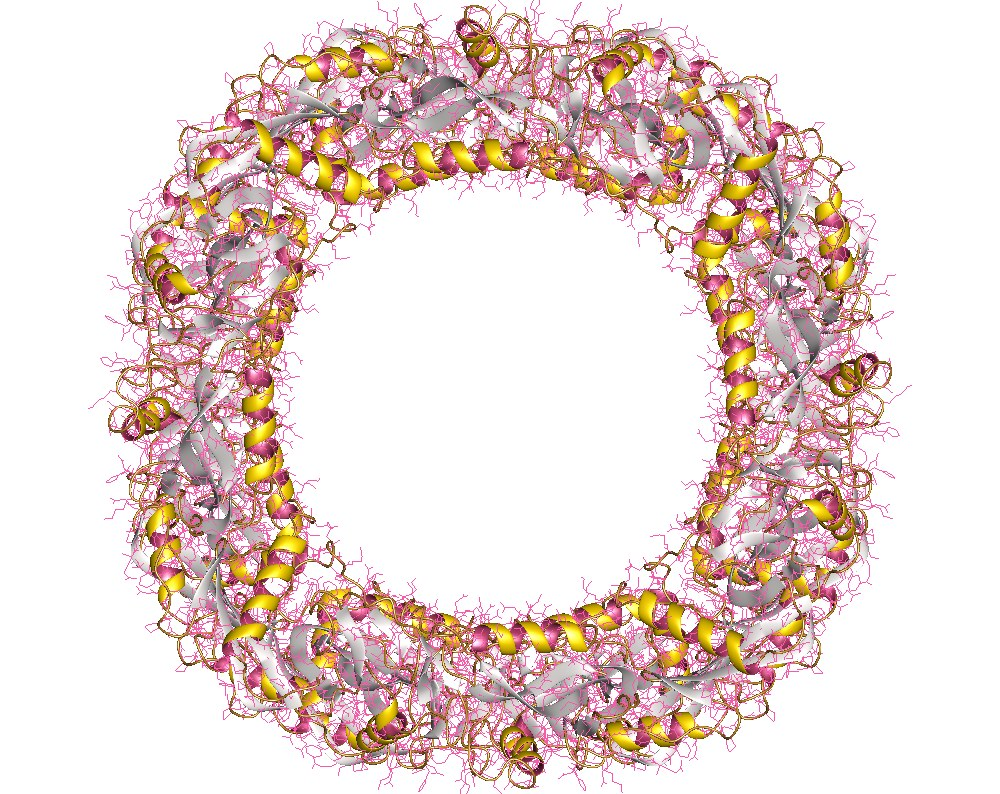
- Mucrocetin hetero24mer (A+B)

Identifiers
- Organism: Protobothrops mucrosquamatus
- Symbol: ?
- PDB: 1v4l
- UniProt: Q6TPH0
Search for
- Structures: Swiss-model
- Domains: InterPro

mucrocetin, subunit B

Identifiers
- Organism: Protobothrops mucrosquamatus
- Symbol: ?
- PDB: 1v4l
- UniProt: Q6TPG9
Search for
- Structures: Swiss-model
- Domains: InterPro

Mucrocetin is a snake venom platelet-agglutinating factor, that acts in a vWF-independent manner. It binds specifically to platelet GPIbalpha (GP1BA) to a distinct binding site from that of flavocetin-A. It is isolated from the venom of Taiwan habu (Protobothrops mucrosquamatus).

It is related to the C-type lectins.
