= L-amino-acid oxidase =

Enzyme

L-amino acid oxidase
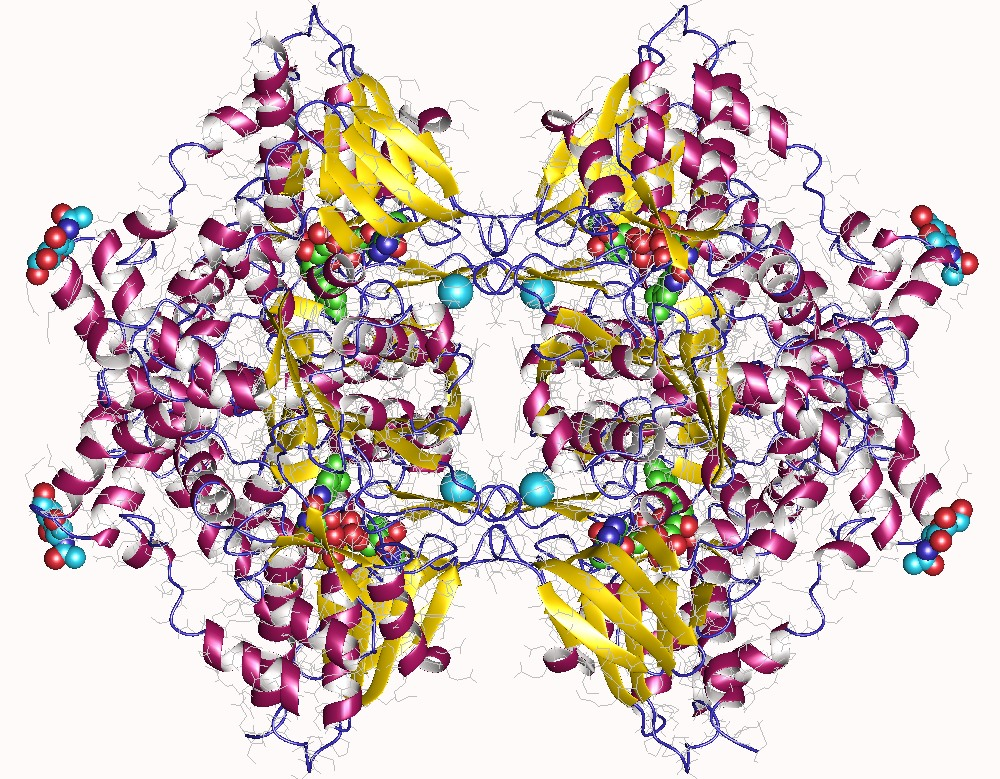
- L-amino acid oxidase homotetramer, Vipera ammodytes

Identifiers
- EC no.: 1.4.3.2
- CAS no.: 9000-89-9

Databases
- BRENDA: enzyme data
- ExPASy: NiceZyme view
- KEGG: enzyme entry
- MetaCyc: metabolic pathway
- Rhea: reactions
- PDB structures: RCSB PDB PDBe PDBsum
- Gene Ontology: AmiGO / QuickGO
Search
- PMC: articles
- PubMed: articles
- NCBI: proteins

In enzymology, an L-amino acid oxidase (LAAO) (EC 1.4.3.2) is an enzyme that catalyzes the chemical reaction:

an L-amino acid + H_{2}O + O_{2} ⇌ a 2-oxo acid + NH_{3} + H_{2}O_{2}

The enzyme was first described in 1944 by A. Zeller and A. Maritz. Not only are LAAOs quite variable in terms of molecular mass, they also vary widely regarding stability. In a similar vein, this enzyme performs in a myriad of biological activities including apoptosis-induction, edema-induction, hemorrhaging, and inhibition or induction of platelet aggregation.

As suggested by the name of the family, LAAOs are flavoenzymes which function to catalyze the stereospecific oxidative deamination of an L-amino acid. The three substrates of the enzymatic reaction are an L-amino acid, water, and oxygen. The products are the corresponding α-keto acid (2-oxo acid), ammonia, and hydrogen peroxide. One example of the enzyme in action occurs with the conversion L-alanine into pyruvic acid (2-oxopropanoic acid):

L-alanine
+ H_{2}O
O_{2}
H_{2}O_{2}
O_{2}
H_{2}O_{2}
pyruvic acid
+ NH_{3}

Recent research has expanded understanding of snake venom LAAOs (sv-LAAOs), revealing their role in venom-induced tissue damage through oxidative stress and induction of cell death pathways such as autophagy, apoptosis, and necrosis. Structural studies have clarified their three-domain organization and active site variability, which underlie substrate specificity and functional diversity. In addition to their antimicrobial properties, sv-LAAOs exhibit selective cytotoxicity against tumor cells, making them a subject of growing interest for therapeutic development.

== Abundance ==
=== Snake venom ===
Although LAAOs are present in a variety of eukaryotic and prokaryotic organisms, snake venom is a particularly rich source of the enzyme and the LAAOs are proposed to supply toxic effects upon envenomation. LAAOs that have been purified from the venoms of various snake species have proven to be the best suitors for examining this novel family of enzymes. It has been determined in most cases concerning the snake families, such as Viperidae, Crotalidae, and Elapidae, that snake venom-LAAO (sv-LAAO) constitutes about 1%–9% of the total protein quantity.

== Structure ==
Most sv-LAAOs are reported as being homodimers with multiple subunits that have molecular weights around 50–70 kDa and the interaction between the subunits occurs via non-covalent interactions. Sv-LAAOs are present in the acidic, basic, and neutral forms of the protein. Studies that look at x-ray crystal structures have confirmed that sv-LAAOs are often found as functional dimers, with each dimer having three domains. The three domains are the substrate-binding site, FAD-binding site, and a helical domain. The substrate-binding site lies at the bottom of a funnel-shaped cavity approximately 25 Å deep, enabling substrate specificity among sv-LAAOs. Structural differences in active site topology likely account for species-dependent substrate preferences. Additionally, LAAOs are thermolabile, with cold inactivation and heat reactivation properties, necessitating specific storage and pre-activation conditions to preserve enzymatic activity. It has also been determined that the FAD prosthetic group becomes deeply entrenched in the enzyme structure, which allows for pervasive interactions with both neighboring atoms and conserved water molecules. Additionally, this flavin-containing prosthetic group has been classified as providing snake venom with its quintessential dark yellow coloration, which is shown in Figure 2.

One unusual characteristic reported for sv-LAAOs regards the cold inactivation and heat reactivation properties of the protein. Thereby, most sv-LAAOs are considered to be thermolabile enzymes.

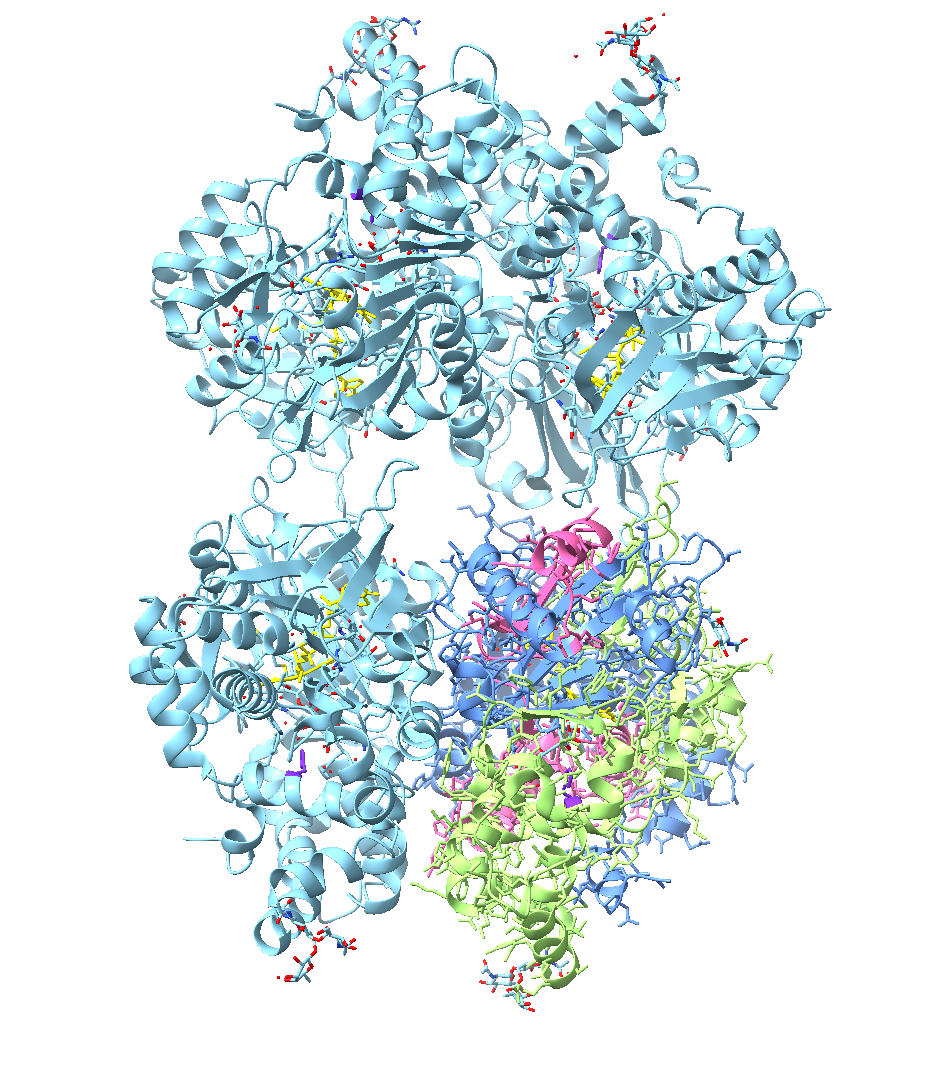
Structure of L-amino acid oxidase (LAAO) from the venom of Calloselasma rhodostoma, shown as a single monomer (PDB ID: 1F8R). The FAD-binding domain (darker blue), substrate-binding domain (green), and helical domain (pink) are highlighted to illustrate the enzyme's three-domain architecture. The active site, shown in yellow, includes the flavin adenine dinucleotide (FAD) cofactor and a phenylalanine substrate analog. The structure reveals how the spatial arrangement of these domains supports the enzyme's oxidative deamination activity and highlights the catalytic pocket responsible for hydrogen peroxide production—central to LAAO's cytotoxic effects.

This enzyme belongs to the family of oxidoreductases, specifically those acting on the CH−NH_{2} group of donors with oxygen as acceptor. The systematic name of this enzyme class is L-amino-acid:oxygen oxidoreductase (deaminating). This enzyme is also called ophio-amino-acid oxidase. As of late 2007, 11 structures have been solved for this class of enzymes, with PDB accession codes PDB: 1F8R, PDB: 1F8S, PDB: 1REO, PDB: 1TDK, PDB: 1TDN, PDB: 1TDO, PDB: 2IID, PDB: 2JAE, PDB: 2JB1, PDB: 2JB2, and PDB: 2JB3.

== Biological function ==
=== Specificity ===
The specific activities of sv-LAAOs with various L-amino acids have been explored. Many studies show that a number of sv-LAAOs exhibit a preference for hydrophobic L-amino acids as substrates. For example, results have indicated that most sv-LAAOs demonstrate relatively high specificities toward hydrophobic amino acids such as L-Met, L-Leu, and L-Ile in addition to aromatic amino acids such as L-Phe and L-Trp.

=== Activity ===
This enzyme participates in 8 metabolic pathways: alanine and aspartate metabolism, methionine metabolism, valine, leucine and isoleucine degradation, tyrosine metabolism, phenylalanine metabolism, tryptophan metabolism, phenylalanine, tyrosine and tryptophan biosynthesis, and alkaloid biosynthesis. It employs one cofactor, flavin adenine dinucleotide (FAD). The enzyme binds to FAD in the first step of the catalytic process, thereby reducing FAD to FADH_{2}. The FAD is regenerated from FADH_{2} by oxidation as a result of O_{2} being reduced to H_{2}O_{2}. The mechanism proceeds via oxidative deamination of the L-amino acid, which affords an imino acid intermediate. Following hydrolysis of the intermediate, the enzyme successfully affords the 2-oxo acid, as shown in Scheme 1.

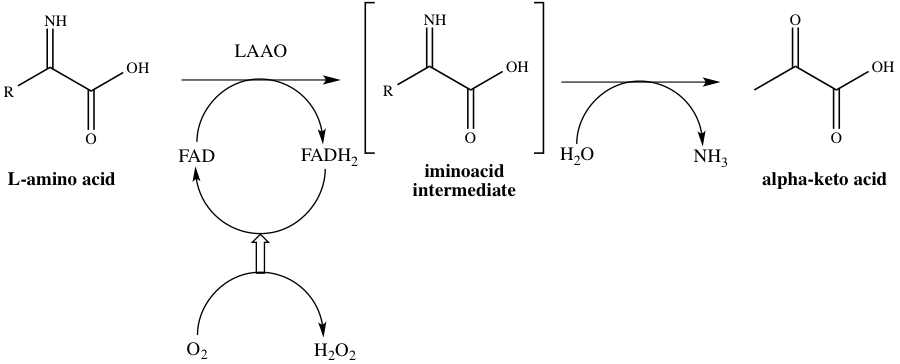
Scheme 1: General enzymatic reaction scheme for L-amino acid oxidase

A variety of biological activities have been discovered from isolated sv-LAAOs including cytotoxic, antibacterial, antiviral, and antiparasitic activities as well as platelet aggregation effects. These activities can be defined by the enzyme's ability to provoke oxidative stress by forming oxygen radicals and hydrogen peroxide. The particular mechanism of action of sv-LAAOs in terms of platelet aggregation has been determined less clear, because some sv-LAAOs are known to create aggregates and some are known to be anti-aggregating factors. Recent work has shown that LAAO binds directly to the surface of bacterial and mammalian cancer cells, concentrating hydrogen peroxide production at the cell membrane interface. This localized accumulation leads to enhanced oxidative damage, supporting a dual mechanism involving both catalytic activity and membrane interaction.

In recent studies, it has been shown that LAAOs have been isolated from the skin and/or gill mucous secretions of rockfish, great sculpin, and flounder. The presence of these enzymes were identified to be a unique type of antibacterial protein in the external defense employed by certain fish species.

=== Hydrogen peroxide formation ===
Notably, because of its potential in relevant antimicrobial, anti-tumor cell, and/or consumption of amino acids, the interest of researching sv-LAAOs has begun to grow. Many authors have investigated the mechanism of antibacterial action of sv-LAAO. It is well established that sv-LAAO kills and breaks down bacteria by the H_{2}O_{2} that is produced as a result of the oxidation reaction occurring in the surrounding environment.

In one case study, it was reported that the sv-LAAO (isolated from C. durissus cascavella venom) caused the rupture of bacteria membranes while promoting extravasation, or leakage, of plasmatic contents out of the cellular structure. They argued that the amount of hydrogen peroxide generated was sufficient to inhibit bacterial growth, and that the ability of the enzyme to bind to bacterial membranes is not important in its antibacterial activity.

=== Cytotoxicity and anticancer potential ===
Snake venom LAAOs exhibit selective cytotoxicity, preferentially inducing cell death in cancerous cells while sparing normal ones. This effect is largely mediated by hydrogen peroxide generated during enzymatic catalysis, which induces mitochondrial depolarization, DNA fragmentation, and apoptosis. LAAOs from various snake species, including Bothrops atrox and Cerastes cerastes, have shown potent activity against melanoma, breast, and neuronal cancer cells in vitro, with EC_{50} values in the low micromolar range. The enzyme's selectivity and ability to modulate apoptotic pathways suggest promising applications in anticancer drug development.

== Disease relevance ==
=== Cardiovascular disease ===
Cardiovascular disease can present itself in many different forms, from cardiomyopathy to peripheral arterial disease, and heart disease remains a key threat to human health. While there are means of therapy to both prevent and cure cardiovascular diseases, many drugs are unavailable for clinical use due to severe side effects in addition to high toxicity levels. However, in the past decade, sv-LAAOs have shown promise in affecting platelet aggregation. It has been proposed that hydrogen peroxide is considered to play a significant role regarding the enzymes ability to both cause and prevent this platelet aggregation. With this knowledge, it appears that sv-LAAOs could be evaluated as a potential cardiovascular disease therapeutic because of their biological potency.

=== Venom-induced pathology ===
As a consequence of the numerous activities the enzyme participates in, it could be deduced that there is likely some enzymatic function regarding the complex network of venom toxin activities. Recent findings suggest a more defined role for LAAO in venom-induced tissue damage. One study demonstrated that LAAO from Bothrops atrox venom causes cell death in human keratinocytes via a sequence of autophagy, apoptosis, and necrosis, driven primarily by hydrogen peroxide production. In vivo, co-injection of the antioxidant N-acetyl cysteine (NAC) significantly reduced dermonecrosis in mice, implicating LAAO-generated oxidative stress in envenomation pathology.

== Evolution ==
By virtue of its antibacterial properties, it has been speculated that sv-LAAOs are in part responsible for the maintenance and stabilization of both the venom and venom gland in snake species.

== See also ==
- Snake venom
- Oxidoreductase
- Oxidative deamination
- D-amino acid oxidase
