= Syra Madad =

American pathogen preparedness expert

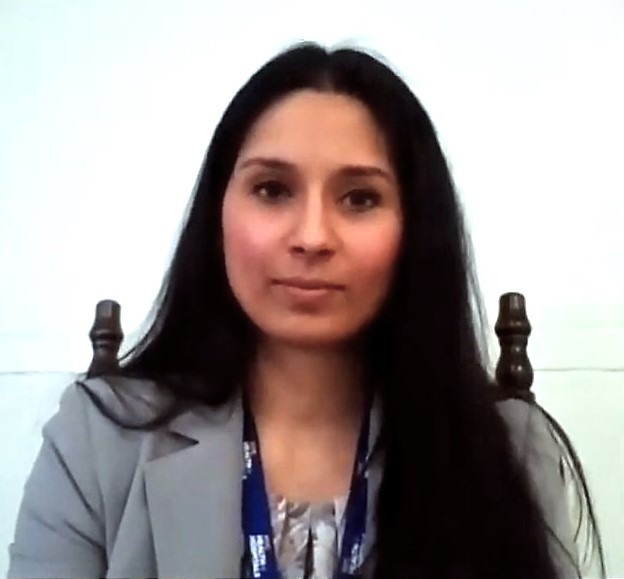
- Madad speaks to the Berkman Klein Center in 2021.
- Born: Syra Sikandar; October 22, 1986 (age 40)
- Other name: S.S. Madad
- Education: University of Maryland, College Park; Nova Southeastern University
- Occupations: Pathogen preparedness expert; healthcare leader
- Years active: 2014-present
- Employer: NYC Health + Hospitals
- Known for: Pandemic: How to Prevent an Outbreak
- Website: syramadad.com

Syra Madad (Urdu: سائرہ مدد, née Sikandar; born October 22, 1986) is an American pathogen preparedness expert and biosecurity advisor. She is Assistant Vice President in the Office of Biopreparedness and Emergency Management and Chief Biopreparedness Officer at NYC Health + Hospitals. She is also Principal Investigator at the NYC Health + Hospitals Institute for Diseases and Disaster Management.

Madad has worked on preparedness and response activities for infectious disease outbreaks, including Ebola, Zika, measles, COVID-19, and mpox. She was featured in the Netflix documentary series Pandemic: How to Prevent an Outbreak and the Discovery Channel documentary The Vaccine: Conquering COVID.

Madad is a Fellow at Harvard University's Belfer Center for Science and International Affairs and Public Health Editor-at-Large at the New York Academy of Sciences. She serves as Core Faculty at the National Emerging Special Pathogens Training and Education Center and as Affiliate Faculty at Boston University's Center for Emerging Infectious Disease Policy & Research.

Madad has served on advisory bodies including the National Science Advisory Board for Biosecurity, the Forum on Microbial Threats at the National Academies of Sciences, Engineering, and Medicine, and the World Health Organization Technical Advisory Group on the Responsible Use of the Life Sciences and Dual-Use Research.

Madad was named to Fortune's 2020 40 Under 40 list in health care and to Crain's New York Business's 2021 Notable Health Care Leaders list.

== Early life and education ==
Madad was born in the United States. Her family is of Pakistani background. Her mother and father married and then immigrated to the United States from Pakistan; her mother, Rehana Sikandar, was 18 at the time. Madad's interest in public health and infectious disease began at a young age, including after she saw the 1995 film Outbreak.

In 2008, Madad received a B.S. in Psychology from the University of Maryland, College Park. In 2010, she received a master's degree in Biotechnology with a concentration in Biodefense and Biosecurity, also from the University of Maryland, College Park. In 2014, Madad received an DHSc degree in health science with a concentration in Global Health from Nova Southeastern University.

== Career ==
In 2014, Madad was Lead Continuity of Operations Liaison and State Trainer for the BioThreat and Chemical Threat Teams in the Emergency Preparedness Branch at the Texas Department of State Health Services. In this position she worked in the Ebola and Other Infectious Disease Agent Surge Team in response to a 2014-2015 Ebola outbreak in Texas.

During this time, Madad volunteered at the Texas State Medical Operations Center as a Planning and Intelligence Specialist. She also volunteered as Logistics Specialist and Trauma Medical Responder at Sector 7 of the Texas Emergency Medical Task Force.

In 2015, Madad was hired as Senior Director of the System-wide Special Pathogens Program at NYC Health + Hospitals which oversees 11 public hospitals in the largest municipal healthcare system in the United States.

Madad is responsible for preparing New York City's municipal hospitals against infection disease outbreaks. Part of her role is to run simulations of outbreaks to prepare staff. In these simulations, healthcare workers care for mock patients and practice cutting-edge treatment protocols in a simulated high-risk environment in which the must act quickly. They also practice use of personal protective equipment to ensure they can wear masks, gown, suits, and gloves appropriately if and when the time comes. During her tenure, she has overseen responses to Ebola virus disease, Zika fever, and Coronavirus disease 2019 (COVID-19).

Since 2019, Madad has held the position of Principal Investigator of the Institute for Diseases and Disaster Management at NYC Health + Hospitals.

In December 2019, she co-authored an op-ed with Joe Biden advisor's, Ron Klain, which warned against allowing an outbreak preparedness program to expire in May 2020. The program, which was funded in 2015 in response to the Ebola epidemic, equips healthcare facilities and trains frontline medical workers to confront outbreaks of infectious diseases. The funding enabled New York City and other health systems to run more drills, exercises, and collaborative public health protocols. Madad and Klain advocated for Congress to ensure the full network of healthcare institutions remains funded to protect against future outbreaks. Their warning came just months before COVID-19 reached the United States.

As the COVID-19 pandemic was unfolding, Madad emphasized the need to monitor the situation and the available research around the pandemic's trajectory and effective approaches to mitigation. As COVID-19 made its way to New York City, Madad oversaw trainings and simulations to prepare healthcare workers for the coming demands that would be placed on the healthcare system. She accelerated training, ensuring protocols were incorporating the latest procedures recommended by the Centers for Disease Control and Prevention (CDC) and public health officials. She also instituted respiratory stations at the entrance of hospitals, which ask incoming patients if they have a fever, cough, or rash to take a mask and sanitize their hands immediately. She provides ongoing support in infectious disease emergency management, and infection prevention and control. In May 2021, her opinion article, "Why Are So Many of My Fellow Health Workers Unvaccinated?" was published in The New York Times.

Madad is an Emerging Leader in Biosecurity Fellow at Johns Hopkins Bloomberg School of Public Health, Center for Health Security, previously Senior Fellow in the Federal Bureau of Investigation's Behavioral Informatics & Technological Enterprise Studies Program. Madad is also an Adjunct Senior Fellow of the Federation of American Scientists and part of their COVID-19 Expert Taskforce. From 2009 to the present, Madad has taught at the University of Maryland, College Park's Graduate Program for Biotechnology and Biodefense as an assistant professor.

Madad is on the faculty of the United States Department of Health and Human Services's National Emerging Special Pathogen Training and Education Center's (NETEC), formerly called National Ebola Training and Education Center, funded by the Office of the Assistant Secretary for Preparedness and Response (ASPR) and the Centers for Disease Control and Prevention (CDC).

== Public appearances ==
On January 24, 2020, Netflix released the documentary series Pandemic: How to Prevent an Outbreak, which followed Madad in her role at the Special Pathogens Program working to prevent an outbreak from occurring and prepare healthcare workers in the event that one does. The film portrays her working to secure funding and preparing personnel in the event of an outbreak. The series was filmed in 2019 and was based on the premise that the world is due for another deadly pandemic. Filming preceded the coronavirus disease 2019 (COVID-19), which did not reach Madad's jurisdiction in New York City until March 2020.

Since the release of the series and the emergence of New York City as the worst hit locality of the COVID-19 pandemic, Madad has discussed the outbreak and pandemic preparedness on outlets, such as CNN, Fox News, Good Morning America, MSNBC, and CNBC. She has also worked to combat misinformation, educating the public on appropriate safety measures and helping them understand what information is actually reliable.

== Honors and fellowships ==
- 2014: Nova Southeastern University, Alpha Eta Health Science Honor Society
- 2015: Texas Department of State Health Services, Ebola Response Team Appreciation Award
- 2015: Texas Department of State Health Services, J. V. Irons Award for Scientific Excellence
- 2017: Johns Hopkins Center for Health Security, Emerging Leaders in Biosecurity Initiative, Fellow
- 2017: NYC Health + Hospital, Insider, Special Pathogens Preparedness Pioneer Recognized as Emerging Leader
- 2017: Johns Hopkins Bloomberg School of Public Health, Center for Health Security's Emerging Leaders in Biosecurity Fellowship Program
- 2021: Belfer Center for Science and International Affairs, Fellow

== Personal life ==
Madad is married to Ali Madad, an AI designer and creative director. They have four children and live on Long Island. She is a practicing Muslim.

== Selected works and publications ==
- Madad, Syra et al. (2020). NYC Health + Hospitals’ Rapid Responses To COVID-19 Were Built On A Foundation Of Emergency Management, Incident Command, and Analytics https://www.healthaffairs.org/do/10.1377/forefront.20200609.171463/full/
- Madad, Syra. (2020). Coronavirus protection – as country reopens, this is your best defense. https://www.foxnews.com/opinion/coronavirus-country-reopens-best-protection-dr-syra-madad
- Shufutinsky, Anton; Shanahan, Paul; Schaal, Nicholas; Madad, Syra; Johnson, David (2015). "Applying Conflict Analysis and Resolution Strategies to Assess Organizational Safety Culture in Accident Investigations" (PDF). International Journal of Interdisciplinary and Multidisciplinary Studies. 2 (3): 71–90. ISSN 2348-0343.
- Madad, Syra S.; Masci, Joseph; Cagliuso, Nicholas V.; Allen, Machelle (28 October 2016). "Preparedness for Zika Virus Disease — New York City, 2016". MMWR. Morbidity and Mortality Weekly Report. 65 (42): 1161–1165. doi:10.15585/mmwr.mm6542a2. PMID 27787490. Wikidata ()
- Madad, Syra; Tate, Anna; Rand, Maytal; Quinn, Celia; Vora, Neil M.; Allen, Machelle; Cagliuso, Nicholas V.; Rakeman, Jennifer L.; Studer, Sean; Masci, Joseph; Varma, Jay K.; Wilson, Ross (7 March 2018). "Zika Virus Preparedness and Response Efforts Through the Collaboration Between a Health Care Delivery System and a Local Public Health Department". Disaster Medicine and Public Health Preparedness. 12 (6): 689–691. doi:10.1017/DMP.2018.5. PMID 29510763. S2CID 3719211. Wikidata ()
- Maher, John J.; Sikandar Madad, Syra; Cagliuso, Sr., Nicholas V. (July 2018). "Chapter 3. Administrative Considerations When Preparing for Bioemergencies". In Hewlett, Angela; Murthy, A. Rekha K. (eds.). Bioemergency: Planning A Guide for Healthcare Facilities. Springer. pp. 35–43. doi:10.1007/978-3-319-77032-1_3. ISBN 978-331-9-77032-1. OCLC 1056975497.
- Vasa, Angela; Madad, Syra; Larson, LuAnn; Kraft, Colleen S.; Vanairsdale, Sharon; Grein, Jonathan D.; Garland, Jennifer; Butterworth, Virginia “Madison”; Kratochvil, Christopher J. (February 2019). "A Novel Approach to Infectious Disease Preparedness: Incorporating Investigational Therapeutics and Research Objectives into Full-Scale Exercises". Health Security. 17 (1): 54–61. doi:10.1089/hs.2018.0100. PMID 30779611. S2CID 73495837. Wikidata ()
- Madad, Syra; Studer, Sean; Cagliuso, Sr., Nicholas V. (additional contributions and editing) (June 2019). Frontline Hospital Planning Guide for Special Pathogens (PDF). New York City Health + Hospitals.
- Klain, Ronald A.; Madad, Syra (27 December 2019). "Opinion: A program protecting us from deadly pandemic is about to expire". The Washington Post.
- Madad, Syra; Moskovitz, Joshua; Boyce, Matthew R; Cagliuso, Nicholas V.; Katz, Rebecca (16 March 2020). "Ready or Not, Patients Will Present: Improving Urban Pandemic Preparedness". Disaster Medicine and Public Health Preparedness. 15 (3): 267–270. doi:10.1017/dmp.2020.7. PMC 7108645. PMID 32172715.
