= Cardiotoxin III =

Cytotoxin 3

Identifiers
- Organism: Naja atra
- Symbol: ?
- PDB: 1H0J
- UniProt: P60301
Search for
- Structures: Swiss-model
- Domains: InterPro

Cardiotoxin III (CTX III, also known as cytotoxin 3) is a sixty amino-acid polypeptide toxin from the Taiwan cobra Naja atra. CTX III is highly basic and hydrophobic protein. It is an example of a group of snake cardio/cytotoxins (InterPro: IPR003572), which are made up of shorter snake venom three-finger toxins. Over 50 different cytotoxin polypeptides have been isolated and sequenced from venom samples. The difference in the CTX functionality may be due to the relatively small difference in the polypeptide's structure, allowing different CTXs to induce lysis in different cell types. The CTX III molecule contains multiple binding sites and is cytolytic for myocardial cells and human leukemic T cells.

CTX III's molecular structure displays a folding of the polypeptide backbone that creates five stands from a globular structure. These strands form a double and a triple antiparallel β-sheet. Studies performed with an antibody complementary of CTX III seemed to conclude that the active site for the molecule's hemolytic and cytotoxic functions and characteristics result from two separate sites.

== Biological research ==
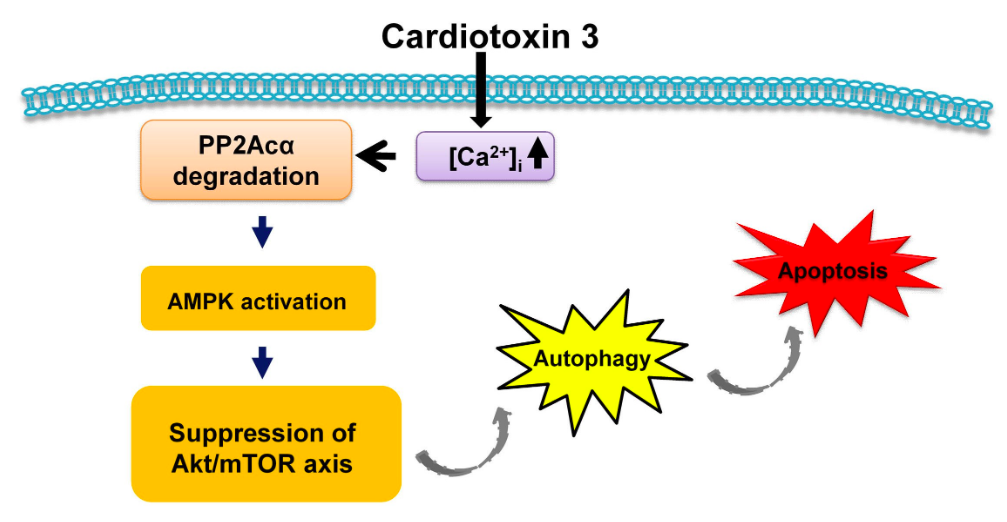
Cardiotoxin III pathway to induce apoptosis in U937, human leukemia cells.

Recent evidence has shown that CTX III may induce apoptosis in K562 cells via the release of cytochrome c. Results indicate that the mechanism utilized by CTX III was a ROS-independent mitochondrial dysfunction pathway. Evidence from a Taiwanese study of CTX III suggest that the polypeptide selectively enhances apoptosis induction in CD8^{+} T cells. Another study performed using MDA-MB-231 breast cancer cells concluded that CTX III could induce apoptosis via concomitant inactivation of the JAK2, STAT3, PI3K, and Akt signaling pathways. In Colo205, human colorectal cancer cells, CTX III was found to induce apoptosis. HepG2, a type of carcinoma cell found in humans, was found to undergo apoptosis through S phase arrest when exposed to isolated toxin samples. The toxin's membrane disturbing activity was found not necessary in inducing cell death in a study using U937 cells via the Ca2+/PP2A/AMPK axis.
