= Atrolysin B =

Identifiers
- EC no.: 3.4.24.41
- CAS no.: 172306-48-8

Databases
- IntEnz: IntEnz view
- BRENDA: BRENDA entry
- ExPASy: NiceZyme view
- KEGG: KEGG entry
- MetaCyc: metabolic pathway
- PRIAM: profile
- PDB structures: RCSB PDB PDBe PDBsum
Search
- PMC: articles
- PubMed: articles
- NCBI: proteins

Atrolysin B (EC 3.4.24.41, Crotalus atrox metalloendopeptidase b, hemorrhagic toxin b, Ht-b) is an enzyme. This enzyme catalyses the following chemical reaction

Cleavage of His^{5}-Leu, His^{10}-Leu, Ala^{14}-Leu, Tyr^{16}-Leu and Gly^{23}-Phe of insulin B chain; identical to the cleavage of insulin B chain by atrolysin C. Also cleaves -Ser bonds in glucagon

This enzyme is present in the western diamondback rattlesnake (Crotalus atrox).
