= Jacob Glanville =

American immunoengineer and businessman

Jacob Eli Gunn Glanville is an American computational immunoengineer and businessperson. He was co-founder and chief executive officer of the start-up company Distributed Bio from 2012 until its acquisition in 2020, and is now founder and chief executive officer of its spin-out, Centivax. Glanville was featured in the documentary series Pandemic: How to Prevent an Outbreak. Glanville was born in The Dalles, Oregon and raised in Guatemala to American expatriate parents. His mother is an artist and his father an inn keeper. In 2006, Glanville graduated from University of California, Berkeley where he studied genetics, Genomics, and Development in the Molecular and Cellular Biology program and conducted research in the Glenys Thomsom HLA population genetics laboratory and Kimmen Sjolander Berkeley Phylogenomics group. In 2008, he joined Pfizer and was promoted repeatedly to Principal Scientist by the time he left Pfizer in 2012. In 2012, Glanville founded Distributed Bio and became the first Computational and Systems Immunology Ph.D. candidate at Stanford University. He completed his doctorate in 2017. His doctoral advisors were Scott D. Boyd and Mark M. Davis. Glanville's dissertation was titled Reading the adaptive receptor repertoires. Microbiologist Sarah Ives was his research Principal Scientist at Distributed Bio on the influenza project featured in Pandemic: How to Prevent an Outbreak.
