= Atrolysin F =

Type of enzyme

Identifiers
- EC no.: 3.4.24.45
- CAS no.: 172306-52-4

Databases
- BRENDA: enzyme data
- ExPASy: NiceZyme view
- KEGG: enzyme entry
- MetaCyc: metabolic pathway
- Rhea: reactions
- PDB structures: RCSB PDB PDBe PDBsum
Search
- PMC: articles
- PubMed: articles
- NCBI: proteins

Atrolysin F (EC 3.4.24.45, Crotalus atrox metalloendopeptidase, hemorrhagic toxin f, Crotalus atrox metalloendopeptidase f) is an enzyme. This enzyme catalyses the following chemical reaction

Cleavage of Val^{2}-Asn, Gln^{4}-His, Leu^{6}-Cys, His^{10}-Leu, Ala^{14}-Leu and Tyr^{16}-Leu bonds in insulin B chain

This endopeptidase is present in the venom of the western diamondback rattlesnake (Crotalus atrox).
