= Mucrolysin =

Identifiers
- EC no.: 3.4.24.54
- CAS no.: 85898-38-0

Databases
- IntEnz: IntEnz view
- BRENDA: BRENDA entry
- ExPASy: NiceZyme view
- KEGG: KEGG entry
- MetaCyc: metabolic pathway
- PRIAM: profile
- PDB structures: RCSB PDB PDBe PDBsum
Search
- PMC: articles
- PubMed: articles
- NCBI: proteins

Zinc metalloproteinase/disintegrin

Identifiers
- Organism: Protobothrops mucrosquamatus
- Symbol: ?
- UniProt: O57413
Search for
- Structures: Swiss-model
- Domains: InterPro

Mucrolysin (EC 3.4.24.54, Trimeresurus metalloendopeptidase A, mucrotoxin A) is an enzyme. This enzyme catalyses the following chemical reaction

Cleavage of Ser^{9}-His, His^{10}-Leu, Ala^{14}-Leu, Leu^{15}-Tyr and Tyr^{16}-Leu bonds in insulin B chain

This endopeptidase from the venom of Taiwan habu snake (Protobothrops mucrosquamatus).
