= Atrolysin E =

Identifiers
- EC no.: 3.4.24.44
- CAS no.: 172306-51-3

Databases
- IntEnz: IntEnz view
- BRENDA: BRENDA entry
- ExPASy: NiceZyme view
- KEGG: KEGG entry
- MetaCyc: metabolic pathway
- PRIAM: profile
- PDB structures: RCSB PDB PDBe PDBsum
Search
- PMC: articles
- PubMed: articles
- NCBI: proteins

Atrolysin E (EC 3.4.24.44, Crotalus atrox metalloendopeptidase e, hemorrhagic toxin e) is an enzyme. This enzyme catalyses the following chemical reaction

Cleavage of Asn^{3}-Gln, Ser^{9}-His and Ala^{14}-Leu bonds in insulin B chain and Tyr^{14}-Gln and Thr^{8}-Ser in A chain. Cleaves type IV collagen at Ala^{73}-Gln in alpha1(IV) and at Gly^{7}-Leu in alpha2(IV)

This endopeptidase is present in the venom of the western diamondback rattlesnake (Crotalus atrox).
