= Convulxin =

Snake venom toxin

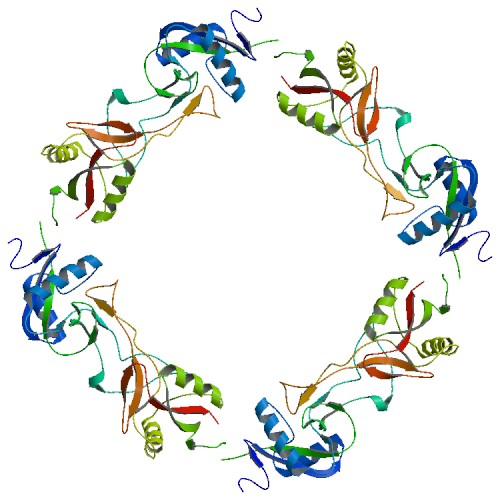
- Ring like protein α4β4 structure of convulxin

Identifiers
- Organism: Crotalus durissus terrificus
- Symbol: CVX
- CAS number: 37206-04-5
- Orthologs: OMA: entry
- PDB: 1UMR
- UniProt: O93426
Search for
- Structures: Swiss-model
- Domains: InterPro

Convulxin is a snake venom toxin found in a tropical rattlesnake known as Crotalus durissus terrificus. It belongs to the family of hemotoxins, which destroy red blood cells or, as is the case with convulxin, induce blood coagulation.

It causes platelet activation in the blood, forming clots and buildup of pressure. Convulxin acts as an agonist to the GPVI receptor, the major signalling receptor for collagen. This can cause the blood stream to burst, or the heart or brain to lose blood, thus resulting in death. It is a tetramer C-type lectin with an oligomeric structure, made up of heterodimeric subunits.

== Family ==
Convulxin is part of the snake venom C-type lectin family, a group of hemorrhagic toxins that disrupt body homeostasis. The name describes their similarity in structure to C-type lectins from other animals, proteins that bind calcium to induce various signalling pathways.

Proteins of about 130 amino acids in length, C-type lectins contain at least a carbohydrate recognition domain (CRD), which mediates sugar and calcium binding. They are involved in various biological activities, ranging from cell-cell adhesion, serum glycoprotein turnover, to immune responses and cell apoptosis.

== History ==
The toxin was first described in detail in 1969 by two Brazilian researchers from University of Campinas, Júlia Prado-Franceschi and Oswaldo Vital-Brazil.

The snake C-type lectin convulxin was reported to activate platelets in a similar way to collagen in the late 1970s, but this was only announced after the discovery of the association with the FcR γ-chain and after it was recognized to mediate activation through GPVI. Now this toxin is widely used to study mammalian platelet receptors.

== Structure ==
Convulxin is a heterodimer made up of α-(13.9 kDa) and β- (12.6 kDa) subunits, with 38% sequence identity and homologous structures. The subunits are connected by disulfide bridges to form a cyclic, ring-like α4β4 structure .

Its function arises from its ability to bind with high affinity to the platelet receptor for collagen, glycoprotein (GP) VI. It is, therefore, an important task to determine the binding site on the heterodimer to the GPVI. The heterodimer structure presents a concave surface, predicted to be the ligand binding site. Furthermore, general research into the C-type lectin family describes the binding site as being formed by loop regions, falling between the second α-helix and the second β-strand on both the α- and β-subunits. Investigating the particular sequences of these structures showed high variability, suggesting that it is indeed these variable, concave loops that offer specificity in ligand binding.

Analysis on the specific Cvx structure has revealed 3 possible sites of interaction with GPVI. Firstly, two adjacent patches of positive and negative charge on the α-subunit; secondly, a cavity in the same subunit lines with the following residues:Trp23, Ser67, Leu104, Ala117, Gly121 and Ile123; finally, a negatively charged patch on the β-subunit.

== Mechanism of action ==
Normally, upon injury to the endothelium, collagen mediated GPVI signalling increases platelet formation by thromboxane A2, therefore creating a blood clot.

In case of blood vessel damage, collagen on the extracellular matrix is exposed. As platelets interact with it, an activation signal is sent for aggregation. Platelets interact indirectly with collagen, via the von Willebrand Factor (vWF), which connects the collagen to the platelet GPIb receptor, forcing them close to the site of vessel damage. There, they can interact with receptors on the extracellular matrix, which stimulate adhesion through integrins (heterodimer α_{2}β_{1}), and downstream signalling. GPVI is present as a complex with the Fc receptor (FcR) γ-chain, which gets phosphorylated by SYK as a result of activation by a stimulus. This generates a downstream signal, leading to platelet activation.

While this is important in case of injury, inappropriate activation of platelets can lead to the formation of clots within the circulation. Such is the case with Convulxin, which can induce a signalling cascade similar to that of collagen. Due to its high affinity, convulxin bind to GPVI and causes clustering of the glycoproteins.

Research has proved that GPlb is not involved in convulxin-induced activation, but that the p62/GPVI collagen receptor is the unique binding site, and protein phosphorylation happens more rapidly and more intensely than in the case of collagen. Furthermore, denatured samples of the toxin containing α, β, or both subunits have been shown not to induce platelet aggregation or tyrosine phosphorylation suggesting that pellet formation requires the native conformation of the protein. However, reduced convulxin subunits still inhibit the effect of collagen since they bind to a common receptor necessary for collagen activation of platelets. The free toxin might be evacuated through opsonization via the reticuloendothelial system (for the most part the liver and kidneys) or it might degrade through the lysosomes.

Therefore, Convulxin acts as an agonist to collagen, inducing platelet activation via GPVI binding, ultimately causing blood clots accumulation in the absence of a homeostatic signal.

== Toxicity ==
Studies carried out on the toxicity of convulxin show that symptoms are a function of the dose. The effects of the toxin stand out through the sudden and brief duration of the symptoms after exposure.

In mice, low doses (5 μg/animal) administered intravenously (I.V) elicited tachypnea, followed by apnea, within 20 seconds. The ED_{50} for brief duration apnea was determined to be 180 μg/kg. Higher doses (10 μg/animal) evoked intense convulsive crisis, and usually ended with the death of the animal. LD_{50} was determined to be 524 μg/kg. Intraperitoneal (I.P.) administration of up to 200 μg/animal proved to be ineffective.

In cats, I.V. injections of 100 μg/kg showed respiratory disturbances, miosis, salivation, abdominal cramps, nystagmus, loss of equilibrium, convulsions and sometimes a brief phase of hypotonia. The ED_{50} dose for convulsions is 80 μg/kg. The majority of animals recovered within 30 minutes.

In dogs, the effect of convulxin showed two stages. After I.V. injection of 100-125 μg/kg they became excited, barked and exhibited loss of equilibrium, respiratory disturbances, nystagmus, urination, defecation and vomiting. After recovery, two out of five animals had intermittent crisis of clonic convulsions that appeared after 24 hours and lasted until their death. The other three dogs showed periods of vivid agitation alternating with torpor.

While the lethal dose in humans is not yet known, what has been discovered is that the level of toxic effects depends on the origin of the snake. As for a cure, so far a polyvalent snake antivenom is being used.
