= Prothrombin activator =

Complex of blood coagulation factors

Prothrombin activator is a complex of a dozen blood coagulation factors that functions in catalyzing prothrombin into thrombin. Prothrombin activator is released in the body by a cascade of chemical reactions in response to damage in a blood vessel.
