= Pandemic: How to Prevent an Outbreak =

2020 American documentary television series

- Genre: Documentary
- Country of origin: United States
- Original language: English
- No. of seasons: 1
- No. of episodes: 6

Production
- Running time: 287 minutes (total)

Original release
- Network: Netflix
- Release: January 22, 2020

Pandemic: How to Prevent an Outbreak is a 2020 American documentary series about pandemics. It was released on Netflix on January 22, 2020. The series covers a range of issues such as the possibility of an influenza pandemic, research into achieving a universal vaccine, emerging viruses, anti-vaxxers, and the Ebola outbreak in Africa. It features several notable health and science experts, including Syra Madad, Ron Klain, and Raghu Sharma. It has attracted particular media attention due to being released just prior to the COVID-19 pandemic.

== Reception ==
Brigid Delaney of The Guardian found the "eerily timed" series "informative, inspiring, visually stunning and a great piece of storytelling". She was also "moved to tears multiple times" by the "kindness and dedication of those who work in the field". James Jackson of The Times thought the coronavirus outbreak "gives an extra reason to watch what's a valuable six-parter underpinned by strong storytelling as it follows doctors risking their lives in contagious conditions", giving it four stars out of five. Brad Newsome of The Sydney Morning Herald found the series compelling initially when it covers how doctors and public health officials deal with the seasonal flu, but less so "as the series broadens its focus" and "begins to slow".

== Episodes ==
No.	Title	Original release date
1	"It Hunts Us"	January 22, 2020
In this introduction to life on the front lines, doctors in the U.S. and Asia battle the flu, and researchers race to develop a universal vaccine.
2	"Pandemic Is Now"	January 22, 2020
Vaccine debates rage while health-care workers inoculate against the Ebola virus in Congo and influenza in detainee camps at the U.S.-Mexico border.
3	"Seek, Don't Hide"	January 22, 2020
Worldwide, scientists test animals and their handlers for emerging viruses. In the U.S. and India, doctors work long hours caring for flu patients.
4	"Hold On to Your Roots"	January 22, 2020
Anti-vaccine debate escalates, and medical staff are attacked in Congo. Funding cuts hit hard in the U.S., but researchers in Guatemala make strides.
5	"Prayers Might Work"	January 22, 2020
Around the world, community, family and faith help physicians and medical advocates stay strong in the face of long hours and a relentless disease.
6	"Don't Stop Now"	January 22, 2020
Successes for some balance setbacks for others. Meanwhile, viral outbreaks continue to claim lives across the globe — and a larger pandemic looms.
