= Glucosaminate ammonia-lyase =

Class of enzymes

glucosaminate ammonia-lyase

Identifiers
- EC no.: 4.3.1.9
- CAS no.: 37290-91-8

Databases
- IntEnz: IntEnz view
- BRENDA: BRENDA entry
- ExPASy: NiceZyme view
- KEGG: KEGG entry
- MetaCyc: metabolic pathway
- PRIAM: profile
- PDB structures: RCSB PDB PDBe PDBsum
- Gene Ontology: AmiGO / QuickGO
Search
- PMC: articles
- PubMed: articles
- NCBI: proteins

The enzyme Glucosaminate ammonia-lyase (EC 4.3.1.9) catalyzes the chemical reaction

2-amino-2-deoxy-D-gluconate = 2-dehydro-3-deoxy-D-gluconate + NH_{3} (overall reaction)

(1a) 2-amino-2-deoxy-Dgluconate = (2Z,4S,5R)-2-amino-4,5,6-trihydroxyhex-2-enoate + H_{2}O
(1b) (2Z,4S,5R)-2-amino-4,5,6-trihydroxyhex-2-enoate = (4S,5R)-4,5,6-trihydroxy-2-iminohexanoate (spontaneous)
(1c) (4S,5R)-4,5,6-trihydroxy-2-iminohexanoate + H_{2}O = 2-dehydro-3-deoxyD-gluconate + NH_{3} (spontaneous)

This enzyme belongs to the family of lyases, specifically ammonia lyases, which cleave carbon-nitrogen bonds. The systematic name of this enzyme class is 2-amino-2-deoxy-D-gluconate ammonia-lyase (isomerizing; 2-dehydro-3-deoxy-D-gluconate-forming). Other names in common use include glucosaminic dehydrase, D-glucosaminate dehydratase, D-glucosaminic acid dehydrase, aminodeoxygluconate dehydratase, 2-amino-2-deoxy-D-gluconate hydro-lyase (deaminating), aminodeoxygluconate ammonia-lyase, 2-amino-2-deoxy-D-gluconate ammonia-lyase, and D-glucosaminate ammonia-lyase. This enzyme participates in the pentose phosphate pathway. It employs one cofactor, pyridoxal phosphate.
