= Cardiotoxicity =

Poisoning of heart electrophysiology or muscle

Cardiotoxicity is the occurrence of heart dysfunction as electric or muscle damage, resulting in heart toxicity. This can cause heart failure, arrhythmia, myocarditis, and cardiomyopathy, resulting in a weakened heart that is not as efficient at pumping blood. While some of these effects are reversible, others can cause permanent damage, requiring further treatment. Cardiotoxicity may be caused by chemotherapy (a usual example is the class of anthracyclines) treatment and/or radiotherapy; complications from anorexia nervosa; adverse effects of heavy metals intake; the long-term abuse of or ingestion at high doses of certain strong stimulants such as cocaine; or an incorrectly administered drug such as bupivacaine.

== Mechanism ==
Many mechanisms have been used to explain cardiotoxicity. While many times, differing etiologies share the same mechanism, it generally depends on the agent inducing cardiac damage. For example, the primary mechanism is thought to be oxidative stress on cardiac myocytes. It is thought that reactive oxygen species (ROS) overwhelm the antioxidant defenses of cardiac cells, causing direct cellular damage. This oxidative damage can disrupt mitochondrial function, therefore disrupting energy production in the heart muscle itself, leading to energy depletion via depleted ATP and promoting cell death through apoptosis or necrosis.

Other mechanisms of cardiotoxicity include inflammatory, DNA damaging, and disrupted cell signaling. DNA damage and disrupted cellular signaling are the proposed mechanism for many cardiotoxic chemotherapeutics.

Regardless of the mechanism, clinical manifestations include heart failure, arrhythmia, myocarditis, and cardiomyopathy that can be permanent. These conditions can greatly alter mortality and morbidity in patients meaning careful monitoring is necessary in patients exposed to cardiotoxic agents.

== Inciting agents ==
The list of inciting agents is vast and involves various classes of medication as well as environmental agents. The effects of the cardiotoxic substances vary and are not all identical.

=== Chemotherapy drugs ===
- Anthracyclines, such as doxorubicin
- Alkylating agents, such as cyclophosphamide
- HER2 inhibitors
- Tyrosine kinase inhibitors
- Antimetabolites
- Proteasome inhibitors

=== Other medications ===
- Antipsychotics such as thioridazine which can prolong QT interval
- Antibiotics such as erythromycin and levofloxacin due to QT prolongation

=== Environmental toxins ===
- Heavy metals such as lead and mercury
- Pesticides such as organophosphates

=== Abused substances ===
- Alcohol: chronic heavy consumption leading to alcoholic cardiomyopathy
- Recreational drugs: cocaine, methamphetamine

=== Others ===
- Biological toxins such as diphtheria toxin
- Radiation therapy is known to cause radiation-induced heart disease (RIHD)

These agents can lead to varying degrees of cardiotoxicity, and their effects may be dose-dependent and influenced by individual factors such as pre-existing cardiovascular disease and genetic predispositions that can foster greater sensitivity to any cardiac damage.

== Treatment ==
The most likely effective treatment is to stop exposure to the inciting agent as soon as possible whether a pharmacologic or environmental agent. While some may fully recover from cardiotoxicity caused from exposure, many are left with permanent damage that may need further management. The management varies on the damage sustained, but generally follows guidelines for each condition such as heart failure, arrhythmias, and myocarditis.

Patients taking anthracyclines can take dexrazoxane as a cardioprotective agent to prevent extensive cardiac damage.

== See also ==
- Cardiotoxin III
- Batrachotoxin
- Heart failure
- Drug interaction
