= José Moura Gonçalves =

Brazilian physician and biochemist (1914–1996)

José Moura Gonçalves (January 5, 1914 – October 18, 1996) was a Brazilian physician, biomedical scientist, biochemist and educator who was one of the pioneers of biochemistry in Brazil.

Moura Gonçalves studied medicine in Belo Horizonte. While a student, he began to work as an assistant in the laboratory of physiological chemistry of Professor José Baeta Vianna (May 30, 1894 – October 1, 1967). After graduation, he accepted an invitation to work on the chemistry of proteins and enzymes at the Instituto de Biofísica da Universidade Federal do Rio de Janeiro, under noted scientist Carlos Chagas Filho. His post-doctoral work was carried out at University of Wisconsin–Madison, in the United States, where he produced what was his most important work, the isolation of a new toxic protein from the venom of rattlesnakes, which he named crotamine.

Returning to Brazil in the first years of the 1950s, he was invited by Dr. Zeferino Vaz to join the new and ambitious project of a research medical school at the hinterland city of Ribeirão Preto, the Faculdade de Medicina de Ribeirão Preto of the Universidade de São Paulo, where he became the chairman of the department of biochemistry, and, after Vaz's departure, the new dean of the medical school, in 1964.
