= Atrolysin C =

Identifiers
- EC no.: 3.4.24.42
- CAS no.: 158886-17-0

Databases
- IntEnz: IntEnz view
- BRENDA: BRENDA entry
- ExPASy: NiceZyme view
- KEGG: KEGG entry
- MetaCyc: metabolic pathway
- PRIAM: profile
- PDB structures: RCSB PDB PDBe PDBsum
Search
- PMC: articles
- PubMed: articles
- NCBI: proteins

Atrolysin C (EC 3.4.24.42, Crotalus atrox metalloendopeptidase c, hemorrhagic toxin c and d) is an enzyme. This enzyme catalyses the following chemical reaction

Cleavage of His^{5}-Leu, His^{10}-Leu, Ala^{14}-Leu, Tyr^{16}-Leu and Gly^{23}-Phe bonds in B chain of insulin. With small molecule substrates prefers hydrophobic residue at P2' and small residue such as Ala, Gly at P1

This endopeptidase is present in the venom of the western diamondback rattlesnake (Crotalus atrox).
