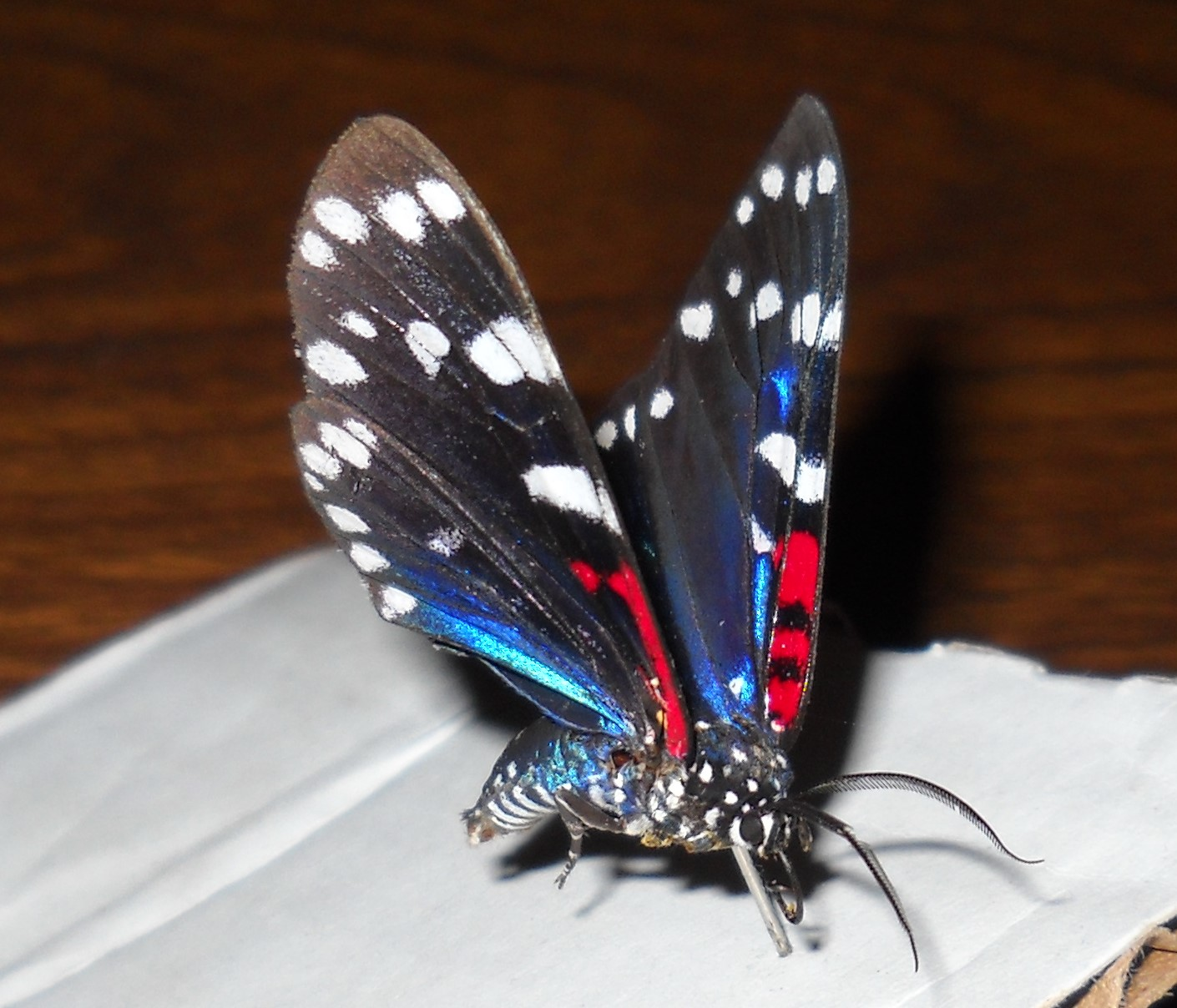

Scientific classification
- Domain: Eukaryota
- Kingdom: Animalia
- Phylum: Arthropoda
- Class: Insecta
- Order: Lepidoptera
- Superfamily: Noctuoidea
- Family: Erebidae
- Subfamily: Arctiinae
- Genus: Composia
- Species: C. fidelissima

Binomial name
- Composia fidelissima Herrich-Schäffer, 1866

Synonyms
- Phaloesia olympia Butler, 1871; Composia vagrans Bates, 1933

= Composia fidelissima =

Species of moth

Composia fidelissima the faithful beauty or Uncle Sam moth is a moth in the family Erebidae. It is found in southern Florida and the West Indies, including Cuba. The species was first described by Gottlieb August Wilhelm Herrich-Schäffer in 1866.

The moth's forewings are black with rows of white dots and red around the costal margin. Their hindwings fade from blue into black, with white dots around the edge. Their thorax continues the trend of white-speckled black, while their abdomen takes on the same blue color of their hindwings.

They have a wingspan of 48–64 mm. Adults are on wing year round. They are day flying.

The larvae feed on Cynanchum scoparium, Canavalia (including Canavalia rosea), Nerium (including Nerium oleander) and Echites species (including Echites umbellatus).

== Subspecies ==
- Composia fidelissima fidelissima
- Composia fidelissima vagrans Bates, 1933
