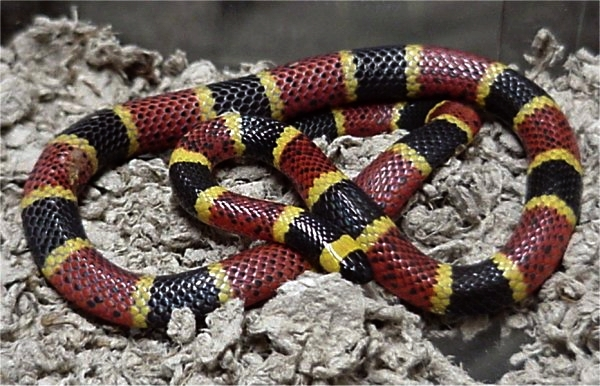

Conservation status
- Least Concern (IUCN 3.1)

Scientific classification
- Kingdom: Animalia
- Phylum: Chordata
- Class: Reptilia
- Order: Squamata
- Suborder: Serpentes
- Family: Elapidae
- Genus: Micrurus
- Species: M. tener

Binomial name
- Micrurus tener (Baird & Girard, 1853)
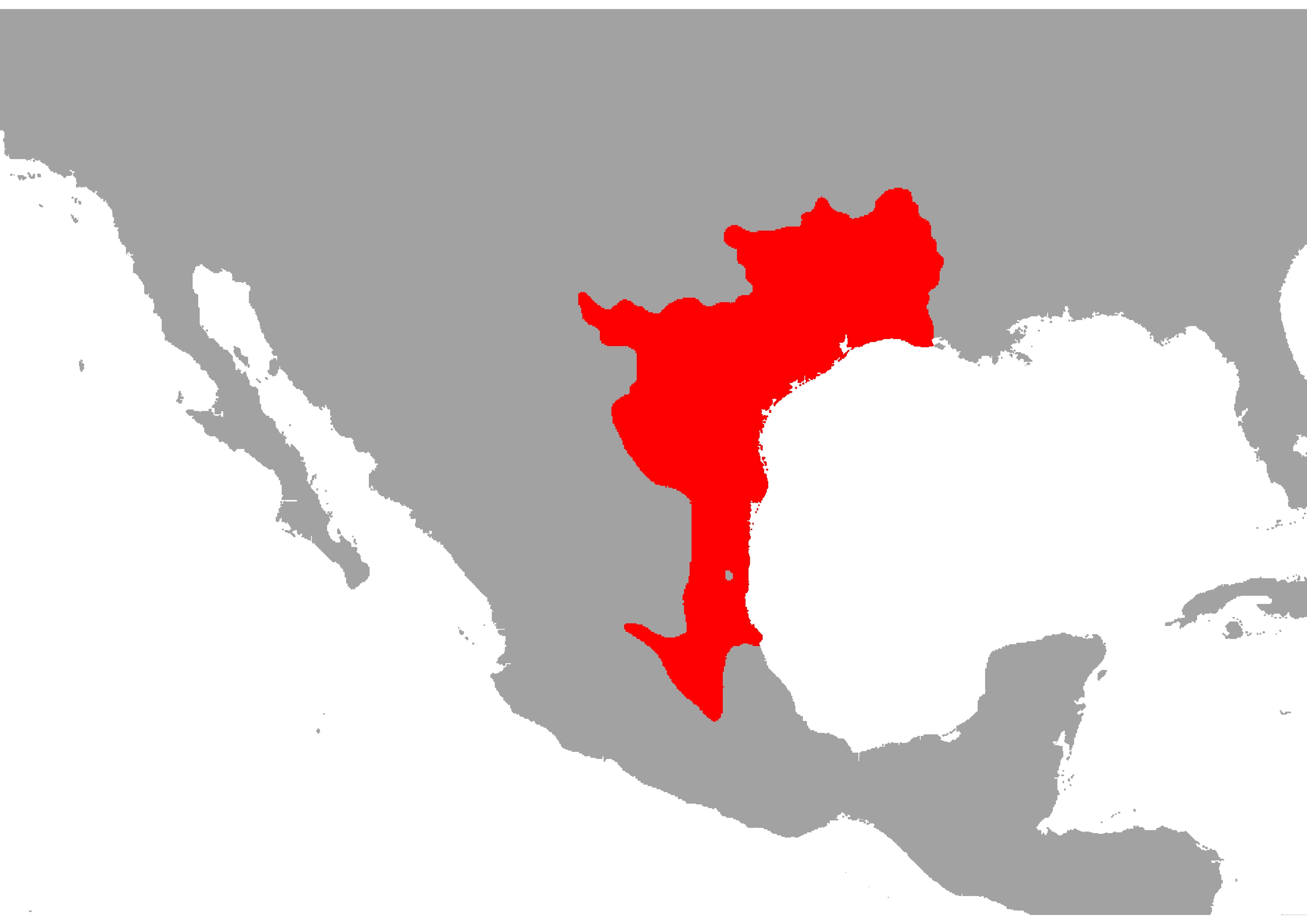

Synonyms
- Elaps tenere Baird & Girard, 1853; Micrurus fulvius tener — Conant & Collins, 1991; Micrurus tener — Collins, 1991

= Texas coral snake =

Species of snake

Micrurus tener, commonly known as the Texas coral snake and el coralillo tejano in Mexican Spanish, is a species of venomous snake in the family Elapidae. The species is native to the southern and southwestern United States and adjacent northeastern and central Mexico. Six subspecies are recognized as being valid, including the nominotypical subspecies, Micrurus tener tener. Although originally described as a species new to science, Micrurus tener was for many years considered to be a subspecies of the eastern coral snake (Micrurus fulvius).

== Geographic distribution ==
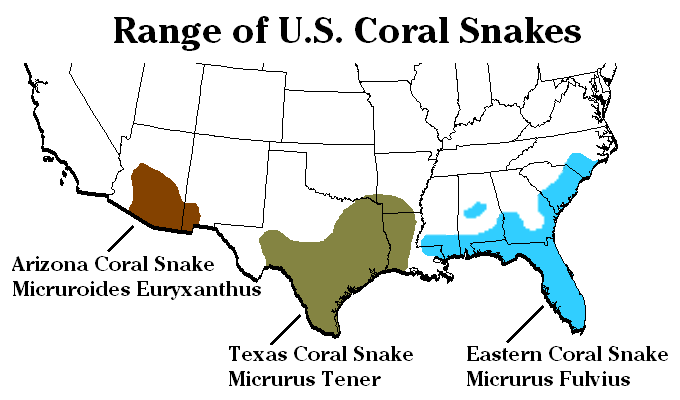
USA coral snake range

The Texas coral snake ranges from the southern United States south to northeastern and central Mexico. It is found in the U.S. states of Arkansas, Louisiana, and Texas; and the Mexican states of Guanajato, Morelos, Querétaro, San Luis Potosí, and Tamaulipas.

== Description ==
The Texas coral snake has the traditional coloration associated with coral snakes: black, yellow, and red rings. These rings extend onto the belly. It is capable of growing to 48 in (122 cm) in total length (tail included), but most are closer to 24 in (61 cm). Males are typically smaller than females. It has smooth dorsal scales, a rounded head, and the eyes have round pupils. Albinistic (lacking black pigment) and anerythristic (lacking red pigment) specimens have been found in the wild. "Pastel" (pink, translucent cream, and very light blue) coloration has been noted, and completely black (melanistic) specimens, are known. The Texas coral snake is somewhat larger (longer and stouter) than the eastern coral snake (Micrurus fulvius), and has a somewhat larger venom yield.

== Behavior ==
All coral snakes are shy, secretive animals, typically nocturnal. They spend most of their time hiding in leaf litter, under logs. They can be seen crawling on the surface, after heavy rains, when the nighttime temperatures rise above 78 °F (26 °C).

When grabbed suddenly, or sometimes just when touched, they may thrash about, swing around, and bite.

== Diet ==
The primary diet of the Texas coral snake consists of other snakes, primarily small fossorial species, but it is also known to prey on venomous snakes such as copperheads (genus Agkistrodon). It is cannibalistic. It also occasionally eats small lizards, but the consumption of rodents by coral snakes is rare.

== Reproduction ==
The Texas coral snake is oviparous.

== Mimicry ==
Other nonvenomous snakes resemble the Texas coral snake as a form of Batesian mimicry. In the United States only, all three species of venomous coral snakes (Micruroides euryxanthus, Micrurus fulvius, and Micrurus tener) can be identified by the red rings contacting the yellow rings. A common mnemonic device is "red and yellow, kill a fellow. Red on black, friend of Jack". However, this mnemonic is not always accurate, due to the aforementioned color variations, and its usage is dangerous to both snakes and humans.

== Venom ==
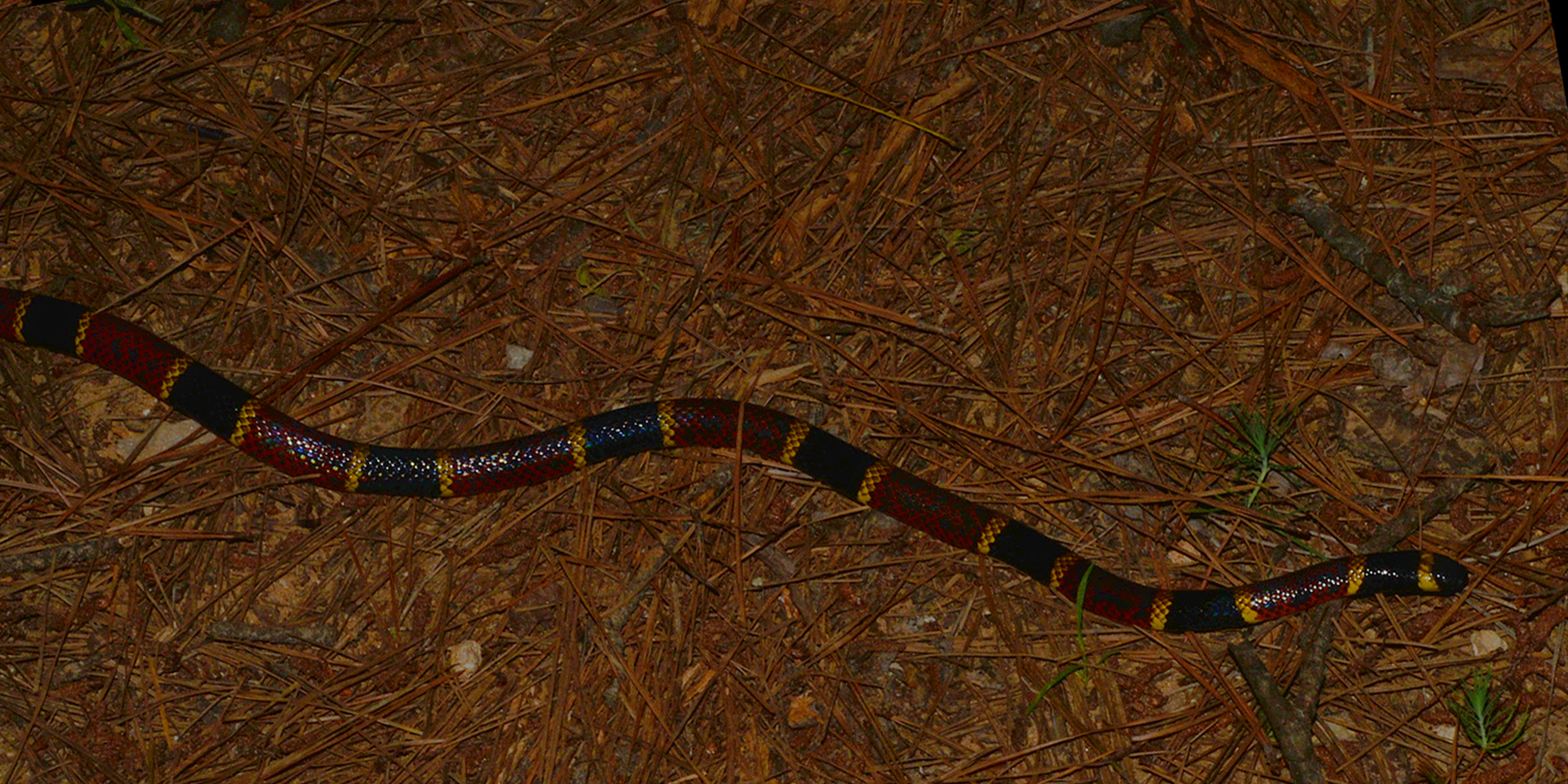
Texas coral snake (Micrurus t. tener) foraging in a pine forest at night, Houston Co., Texas (18 May 2017)

New World coral snakes of the genus Micrurus are proteroglyphous, meaning they have a pair of deeply grooved, semihollow, chisel-shaped, fixed fangs in the front of the upper jaw, through which venom is injected. Though it was previously thought that they to need to gnaw to inject venom, coral snakes need only a quick bite to deliver a significant amount of venom. Many bites from coral snakes do not inject any venom at all (known as a dry bite).

Texas coral snake venom contains neurotoxin and myotoxin. Bite victims may experience potentially lethal paralysis or myolysis. Immediate first aid measures for a bite can include removing any jewelry on a limb that has been bitten (in case of severe swelling) and wrapping the bite area moderately tightly in a wide cloth; however, the bitten limb should be moved as little as possible. Bite victims should be taken to the nearest hospital as soon as possible for more advanced lifesaving measures, such as application of antivenom.

The Texas coral snake can deliver 10–12 mg (dry weight) of venom in a single bite, which is approximately twice the lethal dose for an adult human of 5–7 mg (dry weight).

North American Coral Snake Antivenin (NACSA), formerly produced by Wyeth Pharmaceuticals, a wholly owned subsidiary of Pfizer, is the only antivenom approved by the FDA for use in the United States. However, Wyeth stopped producing the antivenom in 2003, citing low demand and the high cost of manufacturing. The last lot produced was set to expire in 2008, though the FDA has allowed this expiration date to be extended. Prior to the availability of antivenin, the fatality rate of coral snake envenomations has been estimated at 10%, and death was primarily due to respiratory or cardiovascular failure as a result of paralysis induced by the neurotoxic venom.

== Subspecies ==
The six recognized subspecies of M. tener are:

- M. t. tener (Baird & Girard, 1853) – Texas coral snake, coralillo tejano
- M. t. fitzingeri (Jan, 1858) – Guanajuato coral snake
- M. t. bernadi (Cope, 1887) – blotched coral snake, saddled coral snake, coralillo ensillado
- M. t. maculatus Roze, 1967 – Tampico coral snake
- M. t. microgalbineus B.C. Brown & H.M. Smith, 1942 – spotted coral snake
- M. t. tamaulipensis Lavin-Murcio & Dixon, 2004 – Tamaulipas coral snake

Nota bene: A trinomial authority in parentheses indicates that the subspecies was originally described in a genus other than Micrurus.

M. t. tener is found in both the U.S. and Mexico, whereas the other four subspecies are endemic to Mexico.

== Etymology ==
The Latin specific name, tener, means "soft or delicate". This is in reference to the graceful features of the snake.

The subspecific name, bernadi, is in honor of French physician Santiago Bernad, who practiced medicine in Zacualtipán, Hidalgo, Mexico, where he collected the holotype.

The subspecific name, fitzingeri, is in honor of Austrian herpetologist Leopold Fitzinger.

The name maculatus (Latin for "spotted") refers to the presence of some large black spots in the red rings.

The name microgalbineus is derived from a modern Latin adaptation of the original Greek word micro meaning "small or tiny" and galbineus, Latin for "greenish yellow". The name microgalbineus alludes to the narrow yellowish rings of this subspecies.

== Taxonomy ==
The Texas coral snake was once considered a subspecies of the eastern coral snake, Micrurus fulvius, but more recent research has determined that it has enough morphological differences to be considered its own species.
