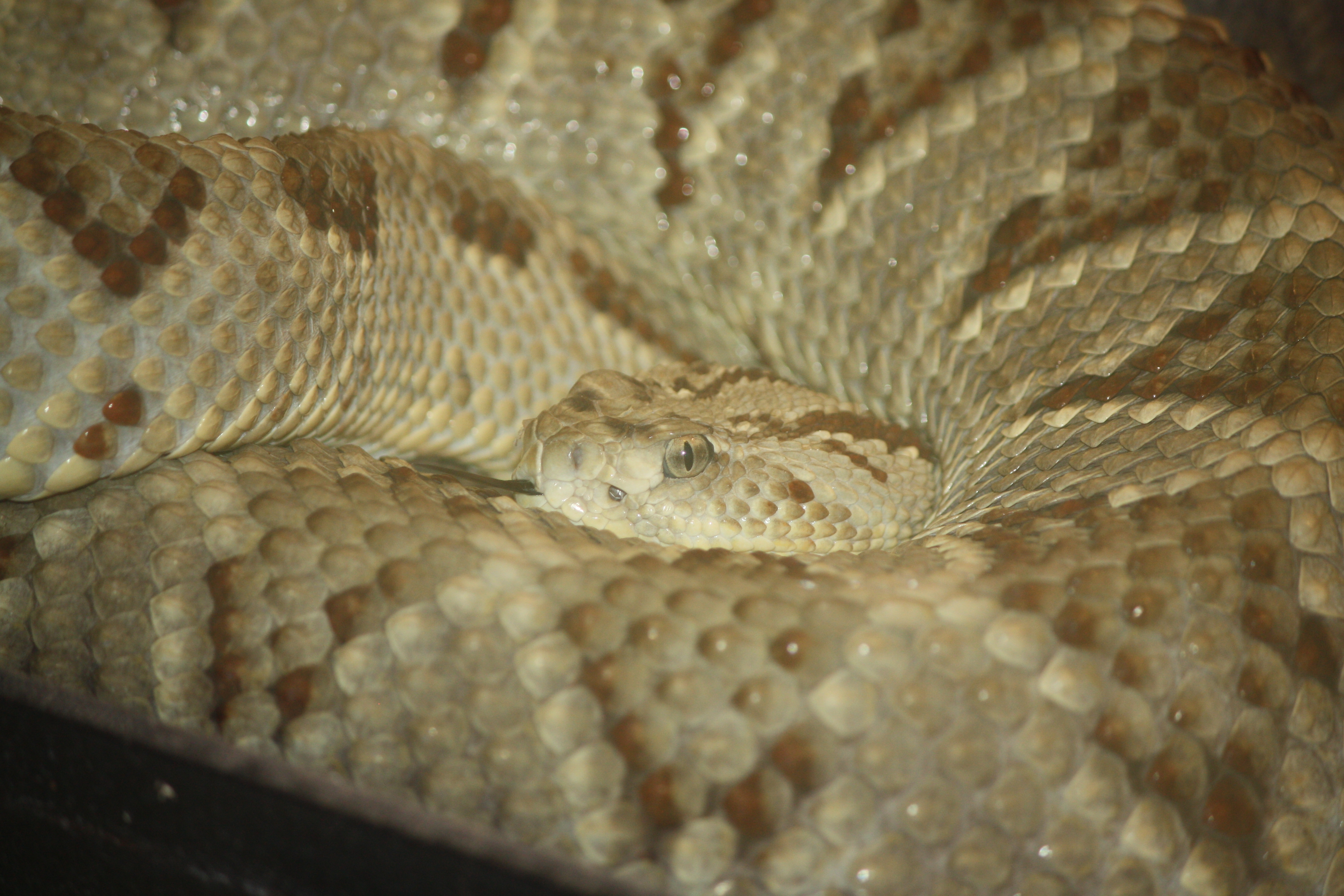
- Yucatán Neotropical rattlesnake (Crotalus simus)

Conservation status
- Least Concern (IUCN 3.1)

Scientific classification
- Kingdom: Animalia
- Phylum: Chordata
- Class: Reptilia
- Order: Squamata
- Suborder: Serpentes
- Family: Viperidae
- Genus: Crotalus
- Species: C. simus

Binomial name
- Crotalus simus Latreille In Sonnini & Latreille, 1801

Synonyms
- Crotalus simus Latreille In Sonnini & Latreille, 1801; Caudisona durissa – Cope, 1861; C[rotalus]. terrificus – Cope In Yarrow In Wheeler, 1875; Crotalus durissus durissus – Klauber, 1936; C[rotalus] terrificus copeanus – Amaral, 1937; Crotalus (Crotalus) durissus durissus – J. Peters & Orejas-Miranda, 1970; Crotalus durissus neoleonensis – Juliá-Zertuche & Treviño-Saldaña, 1978 (nomen nudum); Crotalus simus – Porras & Solarzano, 2006; Crotalus simus – Quijada-Mascareñas & Wüster, 2006

= Crotalus simus =

Middle American rattlesnake

Species of snake

Common names: Middle American rattlesnake, Central American rattlesnake, tzabcan (local name for subspecies C. s. tzabcan)

Crotalus simus is a venomous pit viper species found in Mexico and Central America. The specific epithet is Latin for "flat-nosed", likely because its head is blunt compared with lanceheads (Bothrops).

== Description ==
Adults commonly exceed 130 cm (51 in) in length, with males growing larger than females. Large males reach 140–160 cm (55–63 in) in some populations. The maximum length is 180 cm (71 in).

The body has a rough appearance because the dorsal scale keels are accentuated into protuberances or tuberculations. This is most apparent on the scale rows on either side of the body with a decreasing intensity in the lower rows. The vertebral scales are about as prominently keeled as the fourth row down on the flanks (with the vertebral scales as the first row).

== Distribution and habitat ==
The species is found from Mexico in southwestern Michoacán on the Pacific coast, and Veracruz and the Yucatan Peninsula on the Atlantic coast, south through Belize, Guatemala, El Salvador, Honduras, and Nicaragua to west-central Costa Rica. It is absent from Panama, but apparently does occur on the Atlantic side of Colombia. The type locality given is "Ceylan", which is incorrect. A neotype from the vicinity of El Arenal, Zacapa Department, Guatemala, at 360 m above sea level was selected.

Its habitats are semiarid, including dry or very dry tropical forests, thorn woodland, and arid scrub forest. It also occurs in mesic forests with relatively dry, open areas.

== Uses ==
To the Mayans, the Yucatan species (C. tzabcan) is greatly revered. The word tzabcan means rattlesnake in Mayan. There are many representations of snakes in Maya art. Although many temples have rattlesnake shapes carved, what the rattlesnake actually symbolizes is unknown. Shamans dry and roast rattlesnakes, grinding them into a powder used as medicine.

== Venom ==
Bites are similar to rattlesnake bites in the United States. Local symptoms may be severe, with pain, massive swelling, blistering, and necrosis that lead to fasciotomies and in some cases amputations. Systemic effects involving hemostatic disturbances are rare, as are kidney failure, and neurotoxicity. Only venom from neonates contains crotoxin; a constituent typically found in C. durissus venom that produces neurotoxic symptoms.

== Taxonomy ==
Previously, until 2004, the description for this form was listed as the nominate subspecies for the tropical rattlesnake, C. durissus. Molecular genetic data suggest the taxa culminatus and tzabcan should be considered as separate species from C. simus
