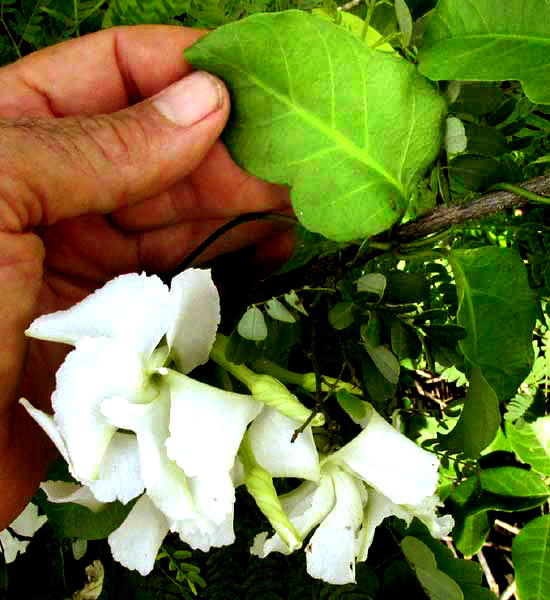
- Echites yucatanensis leaves & flowers

Scientific classification
- Kingdom: Plantae
- Clade: Tracheophytes
- Clade: Angiosperms
- Clade: Eudicots
- Clade: Asterids
- Order: Gentianales
- Family: Apocynaceae
- Genus: Echites
- Species: E. yucatanensis

Binomial name
- Echites yucatanensis Millsp. ex Standl.

Synonyms
- Echites circinnalis Woodson; Echites elegantulus Planch.; Echites turriger Woodson

= Echites yucatanensis =

Species of plant

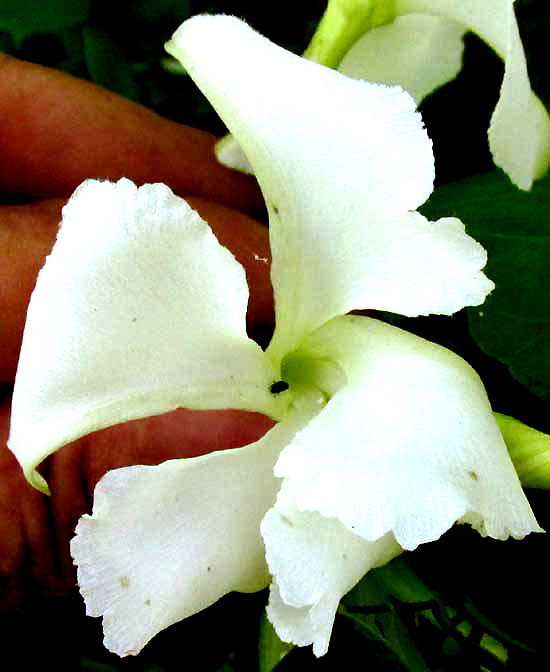
Flower from above

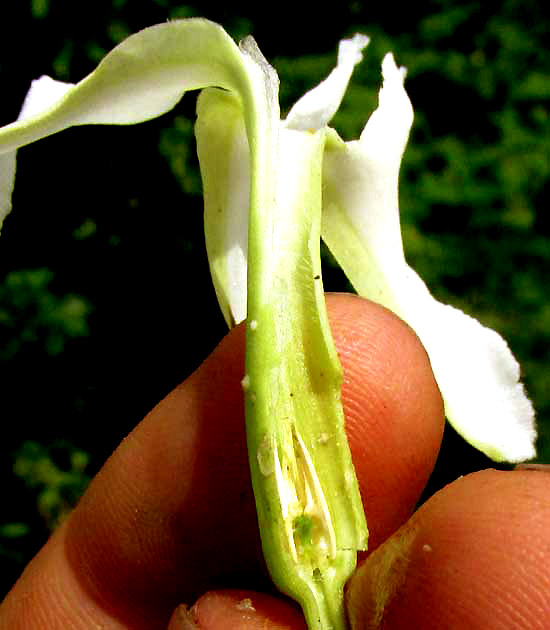
Dissected flower

Echites yucatanensis, with no commonly accepted English name, is a neotropical climbing species of flowering plant belonging to the family Apocynaceae.

== Description ==
Echites yucatanensis displays these key features:

- Climbing stems usually are woody at their bases but herbaceous at their tips.
- Leaves have egg-shaped to violin-shaped blades up to 12 cm (4.7 in) long and 7 cm (2.8 in) wide and are of modestly thick, almost leathery texture. Blade tips are pointed.
- Inflorescences arise on peduncles up to 3 cm (1.2 in) long, are produced along stem lengths, and comprise 3-10 flowers.
- Flower sepals are narrowly triangular and up to 7 mm (0.28 in) long. The white corollas consist of a narrow tube that abruptly expands in a flat-spreading top part (salverform), up to 10.2 cm long. Stamens are inserted at the tube's middle. There are two ovaries, fused at their styles, and nectaries surrounding the ovaries' bases are fused into cups whose rims may be notched by varying degrees.
- Follicle-type fruits are up to 29 cm (11 in) long. Seeds up to 22 mm (0.87 in) long are topped by tufts of hairs up to 3 cm (1.2 in) long.

== Taxonomy ==
The name Echites yucatanensis was first proposed or informally described by Charles Frederick Millspaugh, but that work was not deemed to meet the requirements for valid publication. The name was validly named and described by Paul Carpenter Standley in 1930 with the resulting authorship designated at "Millsp. ex Standl".

Standley's type specimen had been collected by George Franklin Gaumer, his #1979, from Mexico's Yucatan Peninsula.

=== Etymology ===
The genus name Echites is based on the Greek echis, which means "viper", and ites, meaning "of the nature of", alluding to the twining habit and deleterious quality of the genus's species.

The species name yucatanensis refers to Mexico's Yucatan Peninsula. In 1930 when Standley described the species, the specimens he had available all were from the Peninsula.

== Distribution ==
Echites yucatanensis occurs from southern Mexico south into Nicaragua..

=== An alternative distribution concept ===
Based on leaf shape, corolla tube length, nectary configuration, and accepting Echites turriger as a species distinct from Echites yucatanensis, sometimes Echites yucatanensis is regarded as endemic just to Mexico's Yucatan Peninsula.

== Habitat ==
In Mexico's Yucatan Peninsula, Echites yucatanensis is documented from various kinds of Yucatán dry forest types with extended dry seasons, and among coastal dunes and scrubland behind them.

== In traditional medicine ==
In Mexico's Yucatan Peninsula Echites yucatanensis is used for bites of venomous snakes, specifically for the terciopelo or cuatro narices, Bothrops asper, and the rattlesnake Crotalus tzabcan. The plant's uncooked underground parts are macerated and combined with lemon juice and ice. Mayan healers in Yucatan also use extracts of the plant for healing wounds and treating warts.
