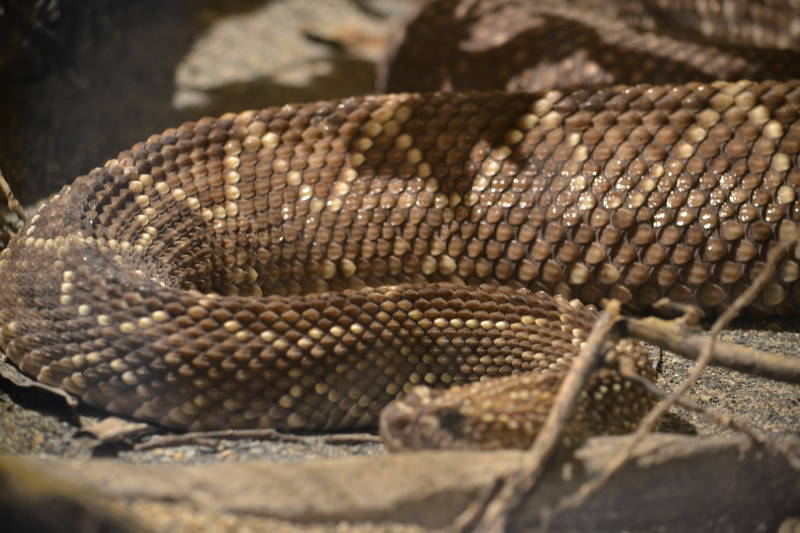

Scientific classification
- Domain: Eukaryota
- Kingdom: Animalia
- Phylum: Chordata
- Class: Reptilia
- Order: Squamata
- Suborder: Serpentes
- Family: Viperidae
- Genus: Crotalus
- Species: C. durissus
- Subspecies: C. d. cumanensis

Trinomial name
- Crotalus durissus cumanensis Humboldt, 1833

= Crotalus durissus cumanensis =

Subspecies of Colombian and Venezuelan snake

Crotalus durissus cumanensis is a subspecies of venomous pit viper from Colombia and Venezuela. They account for 1-3% of all snake bites in Colombia.

== Toxin ==
A bite from Crotalus durissus cumanensis can cause neurotoxicity, systemic myotoxicity, mild edema, acute renal failure and death, even considered one of the most lethal snake species in Latin America. These bites are only treatable by antivenom therapy. The toxin is thought to be more potent than that of Crotalus durissus ruruima.
