= Pyrrolizidine alkaloidosis =

Pyrrolizidine alkaloidosis is a disease caused by chronic poisoning found in humans and other animals caused by ingesting poisonous plants which contain the natural chemical compounds known as pyrrolizidine alkaloids. Pyrrolizidine alkaloidosis can result in damage to the liver, kidneys, heart, brain, smooth muscles, lungs, DNA, lesions all over the body, and could be a potential cause of cancer. Pyrrolizidine alkaloidosis is known by many other names such as "Pictou Disease" in Canada and "Winton Disease" in New Zealand. Cereal crops and forage crops can sometimes become polluted with pyrrolizidine-containing seeds, resulting in the alkaloids contaminating flour and other foods, including milk from cows feeding on these plants.

== Plant types and causes ==
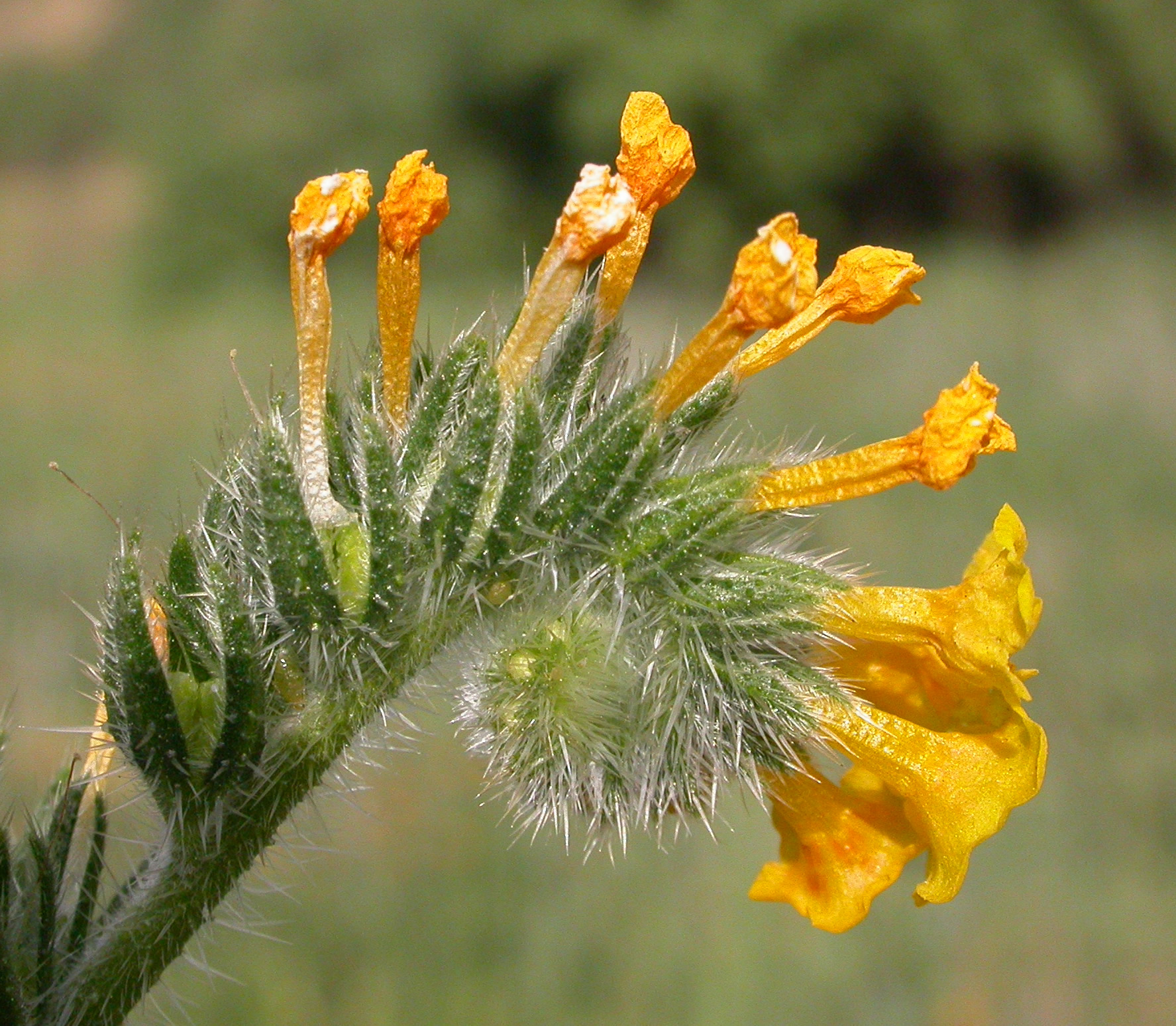
Yellow tarweed (Amsinckia intermedia); a plant which causes pyrrolizidine alkaloidosis when eaten by animals.

Pyrrolizidine alkaloidosis is caused by the consumption of one or more of the 200 known plant species containing the toxic pyrrolizine alkaloids found all over the world today. Established as the most common source of this illness are plants such as ragwort (Senecio jacobaea), woolly groundsels (Senecio redellii, Senecio longilobus), rattleweed (Crotalaria retusa), and seeds of yellow tarweed (Amsinckia intermedia). There are 30 known pyrrolizidine alkaloids that are hepatotoxic, meaning they cause injury to the liver. Although animals innately know to give these toxic plants a wide berth while grazing, in extreme drought conditions animals have been known to ingest them as a source of minimal protein. Animals can also be poisoned if the toxic plant material is in pellets, or harvested with grain.

Echites umbellatus, belonging to the dogbane family Apocynaceae and having the English common name Devil's potato, has recently been found to contain lycopsamine-type pyrrolizidine alkaloids.

== Frequency and exposure ==
=== Humans ===
Pyrrolizidine alkaloidosis poisoning in the United States has remained moderately rare among humans. The most common reports are the outcome of the misuse of medicinal home remedies, or the alkaloids are present in food and drink substances such as milk and honey when the animal carriers were exposed to the toxins. In other countries, mass human poisonings have occurred when cereal crops used were contaminated with seeds containing pyrrolizidine alkaloids.

Infants and young children are most likely to acquire pyrrolizidine alkaloidosis because of their intrinsic nature to put everything they find into their mouths. However, anyone who consumes one of the mentioned toxic plants is susceptible to the disease.

The typical case of pyrrolizidine alkaloidosis toxicity ends in liver damage in the form of hepatic veno-occlusive disease that ranges from moderate to severe, as well as damage to other organs. Monocrotaline specifically causes pulmonary arterial hypertension. The longevity of the disease is wide ranging from 2 weeks to 2 years subsequent to when the poison was ingested. HVOC and PAH, however, are both irreversible once developed. The patient's recovery results may be as diverse as the permanence. Some have recovered as if they were never affected by pyrrolizidine alkaloidosis poisoning if the damage to the liver was not too severe, and others have died from it.

The severity of pyrrolizidine alkaloidosis depends on how much of the poisonous plant was consumed in a height, age, and weight to the amount of substance ingested ratio. The only difference in the symptoms will be how prominent they are depending on the above ratio. Symptoms include:

- Dull dragging ache in the right upper abdomen
- Nausea
- Vomiting
- Diarrhea
- Liver problems
- Acute upper gastric pain
- Prominent dilated veins on the abdominal wall
- Fever
- Jaundice
- Pulmonary edema
- Pleural effusions
- Lung damage
- Lesions all over the body
- Hypertrophy of the right ventricle of the heart
- Damage to the kidneys

To stop the spread and severity of pyrrolizidine alkaloidosis the first step is to remove the poisonous plant from the source. Once the plant has been removed, the alkaloids can be extracted with chloroform. However, ethyl acetate is a handy and less toxic substitute. Depending on the severity of the toxicity and how long the person has been exposed to the disease, there may be no means of treatment and fatality may occur.

== Mechanism of action ==
After oral ingestion, pyrrolizidine alkaloids are absorbed from the gastrointestinal tract. When they reach the liver, they are metabolized via three pathways: N-oxidation, oxidation, and ester hydrolysis. N-oxidation and hydrolysis are detoxification pathways, and the products of these reactions are conjugated and excreted by the kidneys. However, the N-oxide may be converted back into the pyrrolizidine by cytochrome P-450 (CYP450) monooxygenases. Oxidation of the pyrrolizidine to its respective dehydropyrrolizidine is responsible for the toxic effects.

In the toxic pathway, the 2-pyrroline in the core is desaturated via an oxidation reaction to form a pyrrolic ester. This metabolite can still subsequently be eliminated if it is conjugated to glutathione. However, this metabolite is toxic because it can act as an electrophile. It may be attacked by either DNA base pairs or by amino acid residues in liver proteins, resulting in the formation of toxic adducts, including cross-linked adducts between DNA base pairs, liver proteins, or both. These adducts can damage DNA, leading to genotoxicity and carcinogenesis, and liver enzymes and hepatocytes, leading to hepatotoxicity.

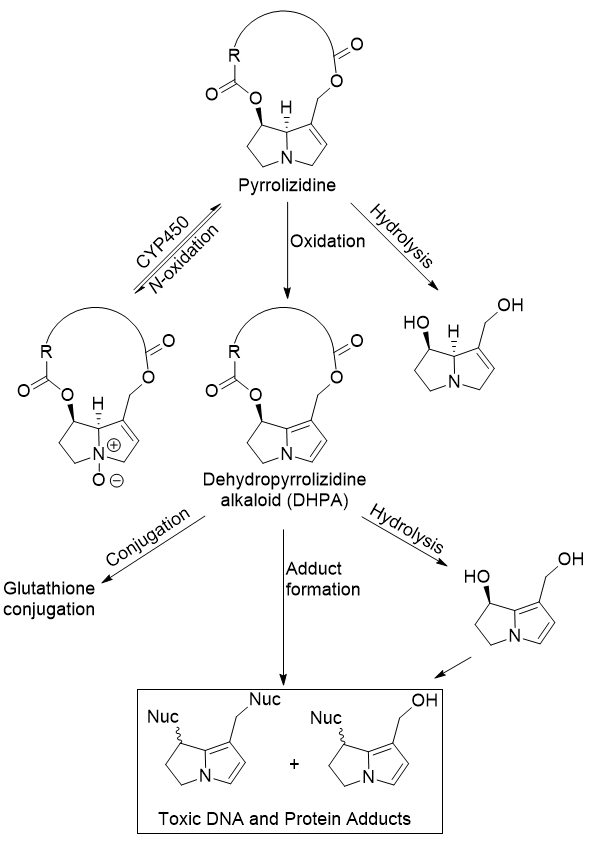
Metabolism and mechanism of action of pyrrolizidine toxicity. Nuc=nucleophilic protein residue or DNA base

== Prevention ==
The only known technique of prevention is to avoid ingesting the poisonous alkaloids. Some methods of control have been defoliation in areas in both Oregon and California. Also mass relocation efforts of moths, flea beetles and seed flies have been made in hopes that they will eat the toxic plants and help control the population of the plants. This manner of alkaloid control has been met with variable success. Because sheep and goats have such a high immunity to the toxicity of the alkaloids they are commonly used to graze on the plants to control them. However, this method has its risks unless sheep meant for early slaughter are used. Before hay cutting in the spring is the optimal time frame for annual herbicide applications which have also enhanced the destruction of the alkaloids.
