= Crotalus durissus maricelae =

Scientific classification
- Domain: Eukaryota
- Kingdom: Animalia
- Phylum: Chordata
- Class: Reptilia
- Order: Squamata
- Suborder: Serpentes
- Family: Viperidae
- Genus: Crotalus
- Species: C. durissus
- Subspecies: C. d. maricelae

Trinomial name
- Crotalus durissus maricelae García-Pérez, 1995

Subspecies of Venezuelan snake

Crotalus durissus maricelae, also known commonly as the Maricela rattlesnake, is a subspecies of venomous pit viper. The subspecies is endemic to Venezuela.

== Etymology ==
The subspecific name, maricelae, is in honor of Venezuelan biologist Maricela Soda (1966–1992).

== Description ==
The Maricela rattlesnake is a slender snake, less than a meter (39 inches) in length. It is greenish brown or dark brown, and it displays 22–24 light rhomboid markings. Its underside is cream-colored at the head, turning to gray for the rest of the body.

== Habitat ==
Crotalus durissus maricelae is known to inhabit the upper basin of the Nuestra Señora River. The Maricela rattlesnake prefers arid areas at elevations of 1,800–2,400 m (5,900–7,900 ft).

== Taxonomy ==
The Maricela rattlesnake's status as a valid taxon is debated, but recent studies declare it a valid subspecies.
