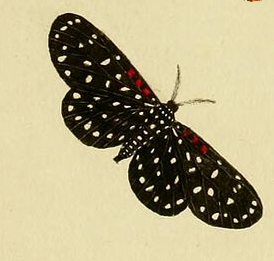
- Composia credula

Scientific classification
- Kingdom: Animalia
- Phylum: Arthropoda
- Clade: Pancrustacea
- Class: Insecta
- Order: Lepidoptera
- Superfamily: Noctuoidea
- Family: Erebidae
- Subfamily: Arctiinae
- Subtribe: Pericopina
- Genus: Composia; Hübner, 1820

Synonyms
- Cocastria Boisduval, 1870

= Composia =

Genus of moths

Composia is a genus of tiger moths in the family Erebidae. The genus was erected by Jacob Hübner in 1820.

== Species ==
- Composia credula Fabricius, 1775
- Composia fidelissima Herrich-Schäffer, 1866
- Composia utowana Bates, 1933
