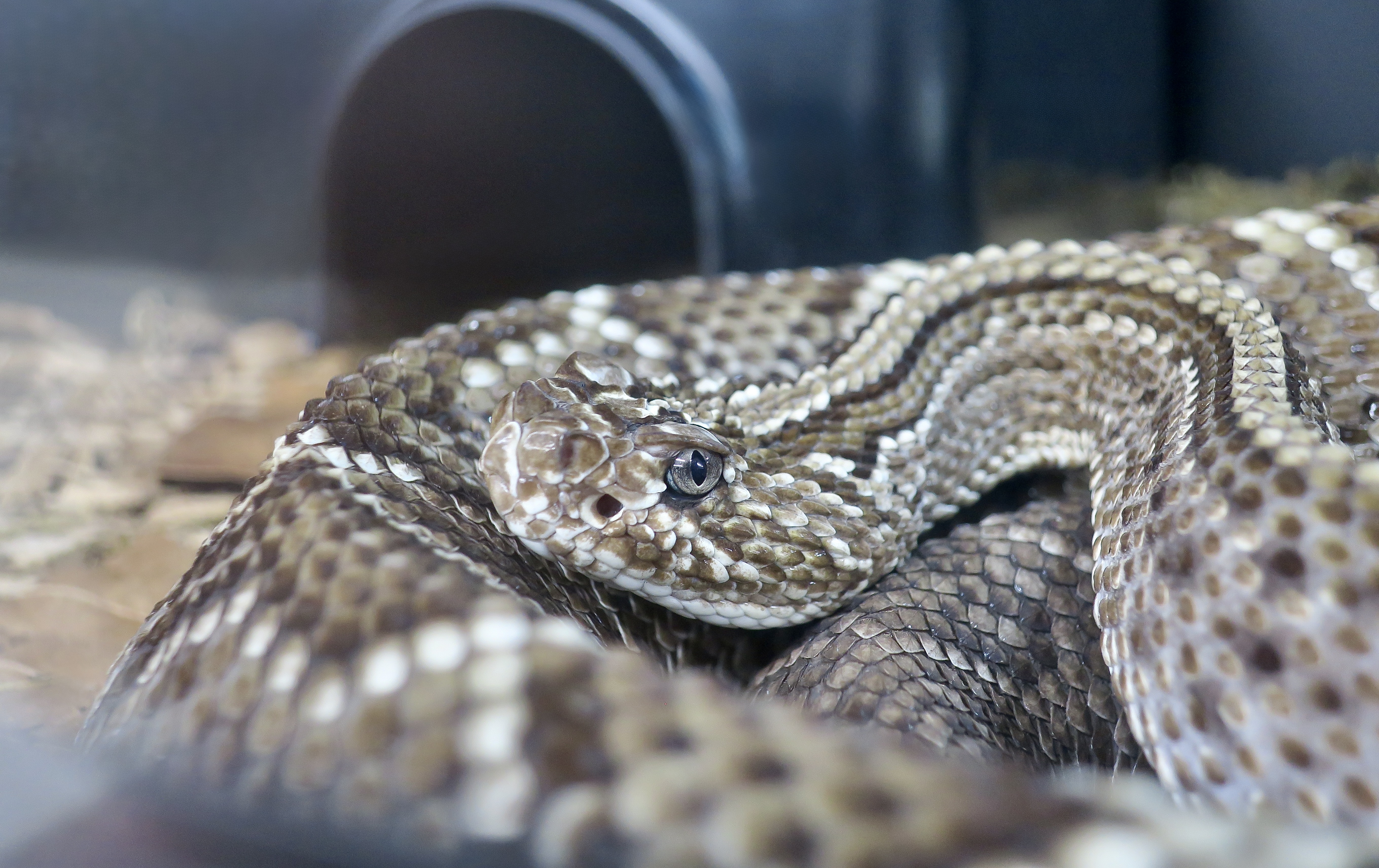

Scientific classification
- Kingdom: Animalia
- Phylum: Chordata
- Class: Reptilia
- Order: Squamata
- Suborder: Serpentes
- Family: Viperidae
- Genus: Crotalus
- Species: C. durissus
- Subspecies: C. d. ruruima

Trinomial name
- Crotalus durissus ruruima Hoge, 1966

= Crotalus durissus ruruima =

Subspecies of Brazilian snake

Crotalus durissus ruruima is a subspecies of venomous pit viper from Brazil. It is restricted mainly to the savannah regions of Roraima, however it has been recorded in the Apiaú region possibly due to the deforestation of its natural range.

== Description ==
Crotalus durissus ruruima displays a pair of dark stripes with lighter centers on its neck as well as a triangular head. It can be distinguished from other snakes by its specific scale count as well as its more conspicuous diamond pattern (with outlines of white) and 31.5 cm to 134.5 cm total body length.

C. d. ruruima could display sexual dimorphism through its specific scale count as well as females being larger on average, however more research is required to definitively conclude this.

== Venom ==
Bites from Crotalus durissus ruruima are known to cause respiratory muscle paralysis, rhabdomyolysis, acute renal failure, pain, edema, myolysis, bleeding, uncoagulable blood and death. It may present yellow or white, with the white venom showing more lethal, coagulant, myotoxic, edematogenic and hemolytic activity and the yellow variety showing hemorrhagic, necrotic and caseinolytic activities.

== Diet & behaviour ==
Crotalus durissus ruruima is known to eat rodents (including mice), lizards (Ameiva ameiva & Tropidurus hispidus), birds and frogs (Leptodactylus macrosternum).

C. d. ruruima hunts by waiting on the ground for ground-level prey. They are also known to share burrows, with up to 7 rattlesnakes being found sharing a single burrow.

When threatened, C. d. ruruima is known to shake its rattle-tail, attempt to bite, perform cloacal discharge, open its mouth, struggle, squirt liquid from the cloacal gland in the form of jets and flatten and rotate the body. The secretion from the cloacal gland has a strong smell and can cause nausea and burning in the mouth and eyes, indicating that this can be an important defensive tactic against predators.

== Reproduction ==
Crotalus durissus ruruima is viviparous and gives birth to an average of 11 young in southeastern Brazil, and 12 to 33 northeastern Brazil. Males may engage in combat over mating.
