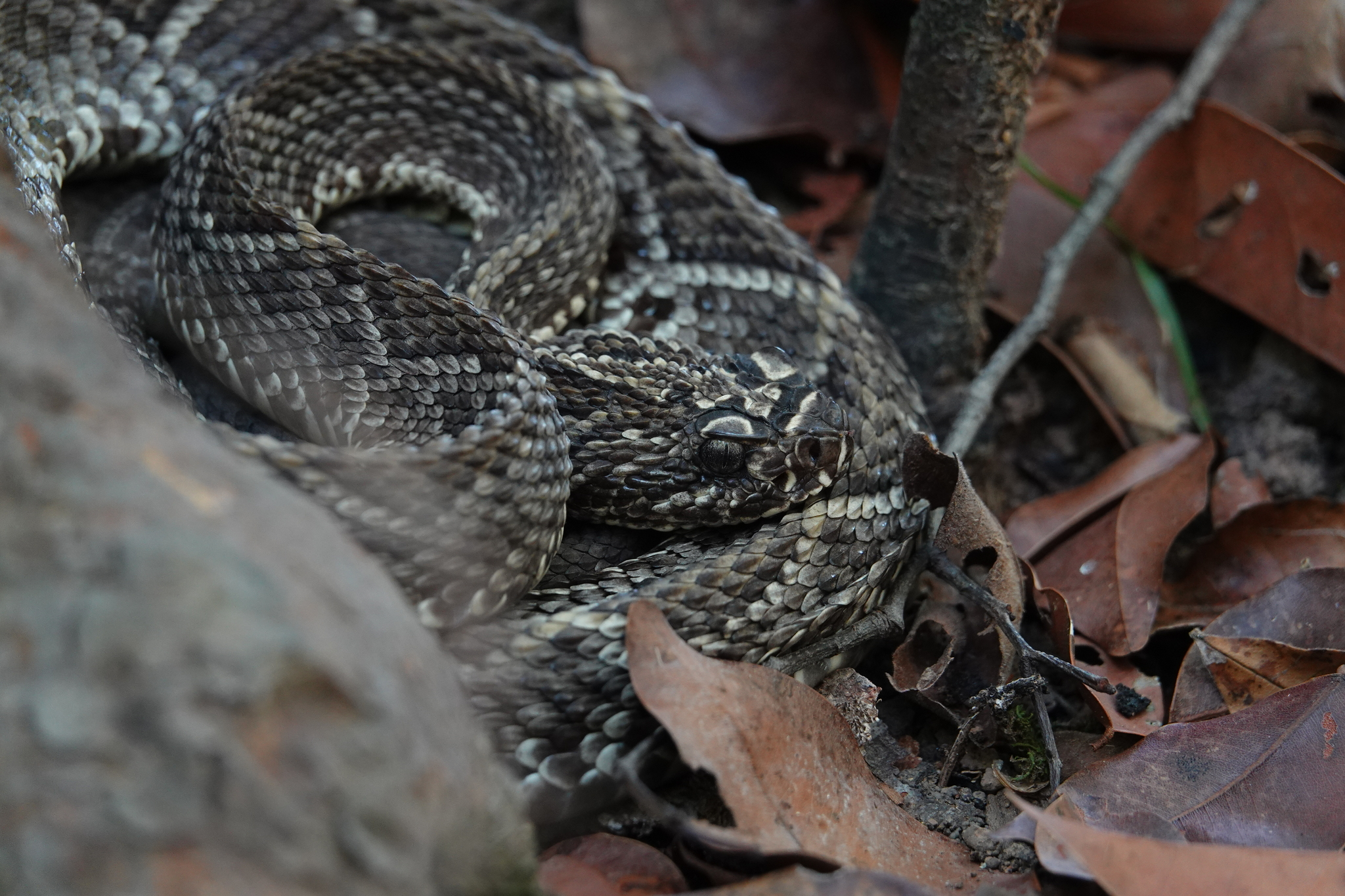

Scientific classification
- Kingdom: Animalia
- Phylum: Chordata
- Class: Reptilia
- Order: Squamata
- Suborder: Serpentes
- Family: Viperidae
- Genus: Crotalus
- Species: C. durissus
- Subspecies: C. d. trigonicus

Trinomial name
- Crotalus durissus trigonicus Harris & Simmons, 1978

= Crotalus durissus trigonicus =

Subspecies of South American snake

Crotalus durissus trigonicus, the Rupununi rattlesnake, is a subspecies of venomous pit viper from the Rupununi Savannah of Guyana in South America which it is named after. Its scientific name is in reference to its V-shaped markings above its eyes. Bites may be lethal if left untreated.
