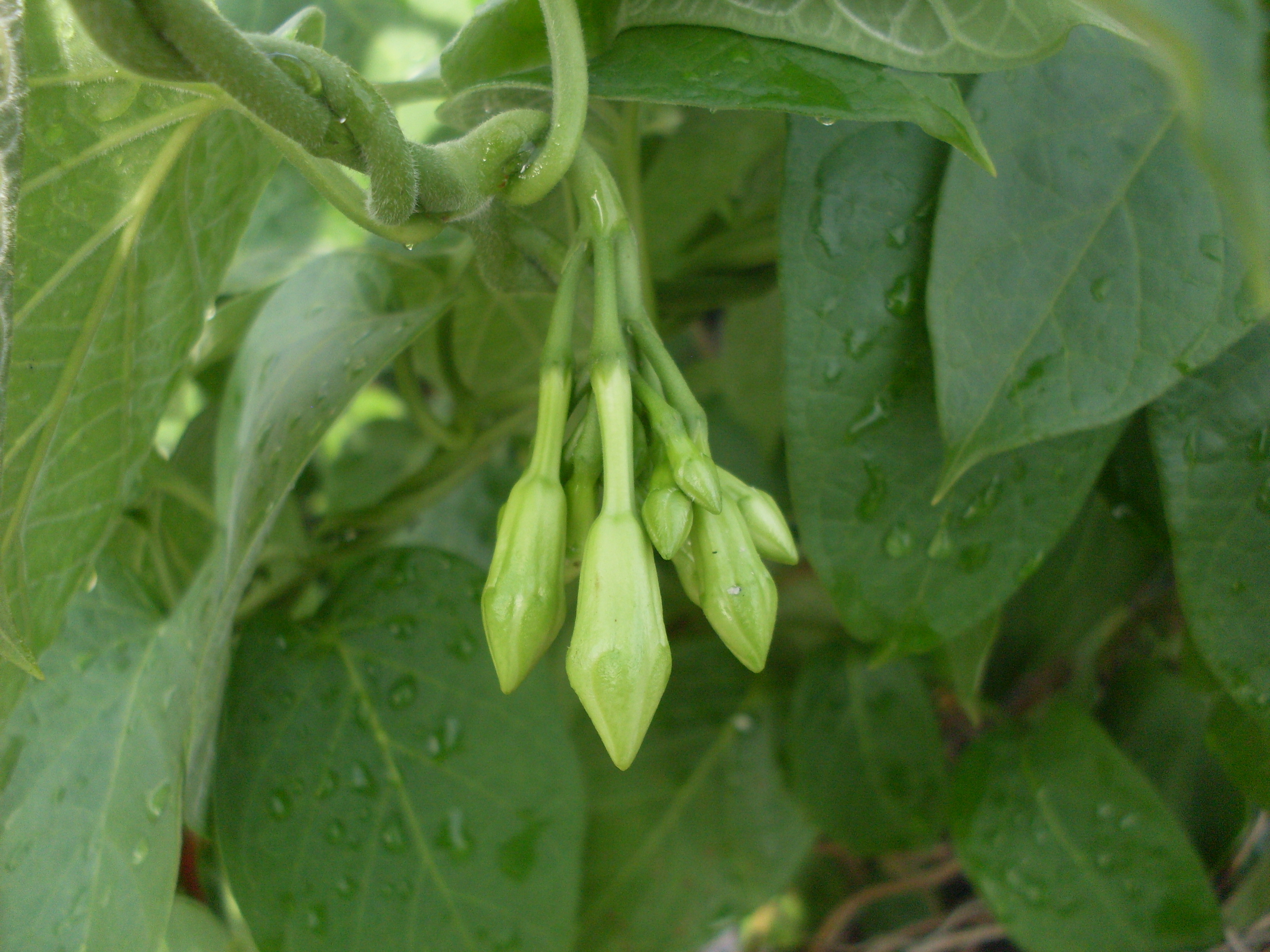

Scientific classification
- Kingdom: Plantae
- Clade: Tracheophytes
- Clade: Angiosperms
- Clade: Eudicots
- Clade: Asterids
- Order: Gentianales
- Family: Apocynaceae
- Genus: Echites
- Species: E. panduratus

Binomial name
- Echites panduratus A. DC. (1844)

Synonyms
- Amblyanthera pandurata (A.DC.) Müll.Arg. (1860); Angadenia pandurata (A.DC.) Miers (1878); Echites barbatus Sessé & Moc. (1893) not Desv. ex Ham. (1825) nor D. Dietr. (1839); Echites pinguifolius Standl. (1930); Fernaldia brachypharynx Woodson (1932); Fernaldia glabra (Molina) Lundell (1976); Fernaldia pandurata (A.DC.) Woodson (1932); Fernaldia pandurata var. glabra Molina (1952); Mandevilla potosina Brandegee (1912); Mandevilla velutina K.Schum. (1895); Urechites karwinskii Müll.Arg. (1860)

= Echites panduratus =

Loroco

Species of flowering plant

Echites panduratus (common name: loroco [loˈɾoko]) is a climbing vine with edible flowers, widespread in Guatemala, El Salvador, and other countries in Central America as well as parts of Mexico. The name "loroco" is used throughout its range to refer to the species.

== Description ==
Echites panduratus is an herbaceous vine with oblong-elliptical to broadly ovate leaves 4–13 centimetres (1.6–5.1 in). long, 1.5–8 cm broad, inflorescences are generally somewhat shorter than the leaves, with 8–18 flowers, the pedicels 4–6 mm. long; bracts ovate, 1–2 millimetres (0.039–0.079 in) long; calyx lobes ovate, acute or obtuse, 2–3 mm. long; corolla white within, greenish outside.

== Range ==
Echites panduratus ranges from northeastern Mexico to Costa Rica.

== Uses ==
Echites panduratus is an important source of food in Guatemala, Honduras, and El Salvador. The plant's buds and flowers are used for cooking in a variety of ways, including in pupusas.

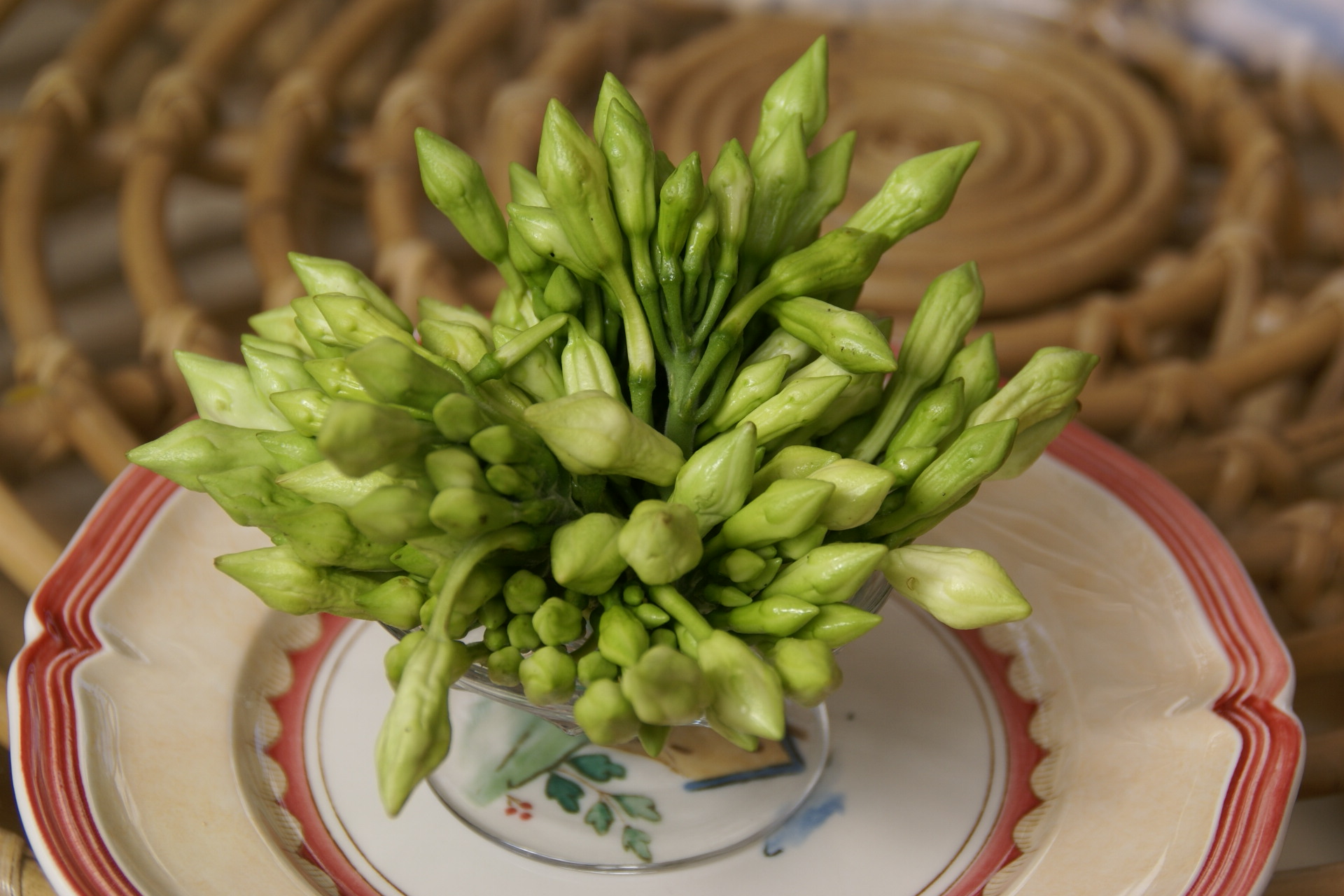
Echites panduratus: Cropped buds for cooking
