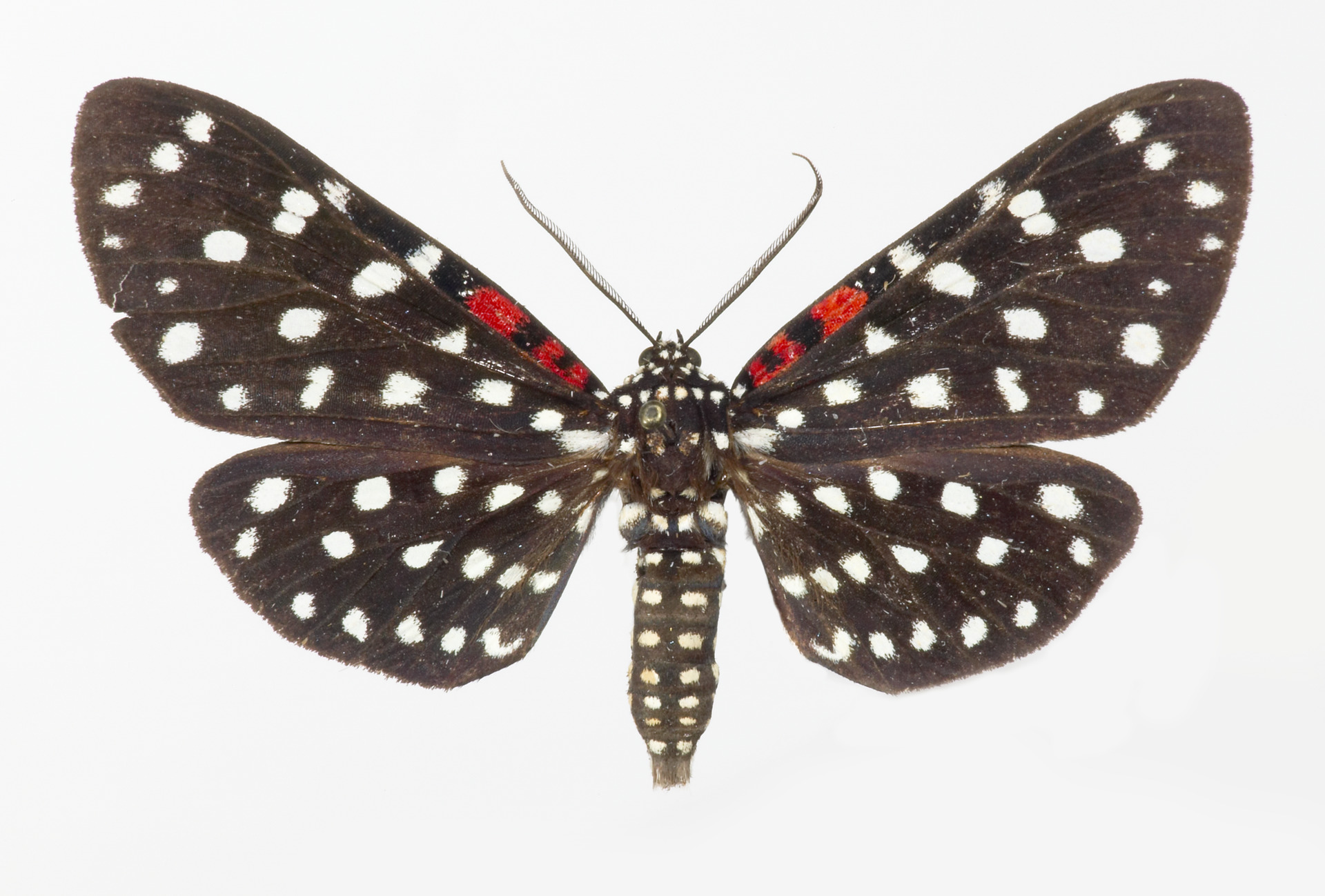

Scientific classification
- Domain: Eukaryota
- Kingdom: Animalia
- Phylum: Arthropoda
- Class: Insecta
- Order: Lepidoptera
- Superfamily: Noctuoidea
- Family: Erebidae
- Subfamily: Arctiinae
- Genus: Composia
- Species: C. credula

Binomial name
- Composia credula (Fabricius, 1775)

Synonyms
- Bombyx credula Fabricius, 1775; Noctua sybaris Cramer, [1775]

= Composia credula =

Species of moth

Composia credula is a moth of the family Erebidae. It was described by Johan Christian Fabricius in 1775. It is found in the Antilles (Cuba, Haiti, Jamaica, Hispaniola, Puerto Rico, the Virgin Islands), as well as in South and possibly Central America.
