= Crotalus durissus marajoensis =

Scientific classification
- Kingdom: Animalia
- Phylum: Chordata
- Class: Reptilia
- Order: Squamata
- Suborder: Serpentes
- Family: Viperidae
- Genus: Crotalus
- Species: C. durissus
- Subspecies: C. d. marajoensis

Trinomial name
- Crotalus durissus marajoensis Hoge, 1966

Subspecies of Brazilian snake

Crotalus durissus marajoensis is a subspecies of venomous pit viper from Brazil which is named after the location it is known to inhabit, Ilha de Marajo.
