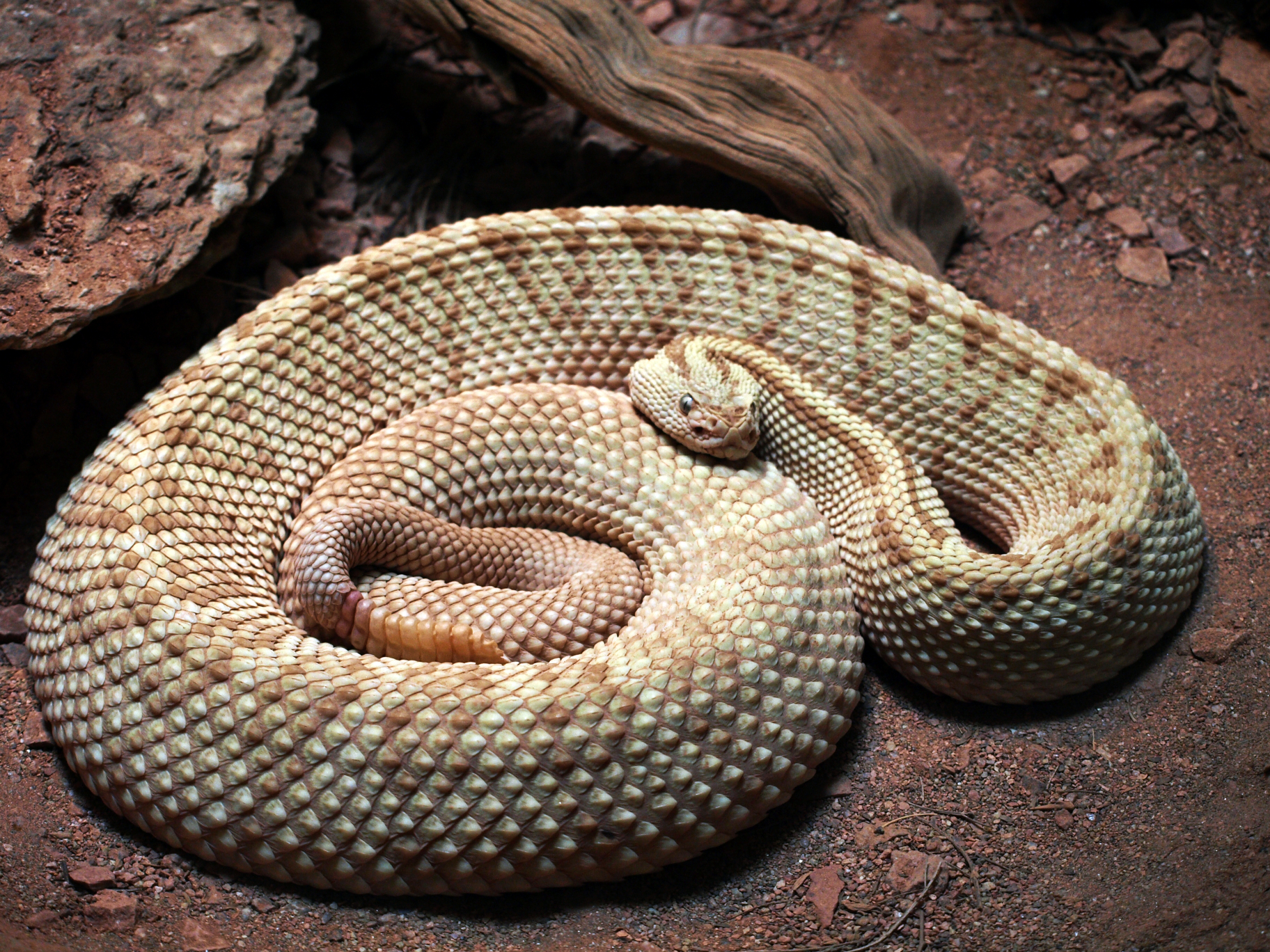

Conservation status
- Least Concern (IUCN 3.1)

Scientific classification
- Kingdom: Animalia
- Phylum: Chordata
- Class: Reptilia
- Order: Squamata
- Suborder: Serpentes
- Family: Viperidae
- Genus: Crotalus
- Species: C. tzabcan

Binomial name
- Crotalus tzabcan Klauber, 1952
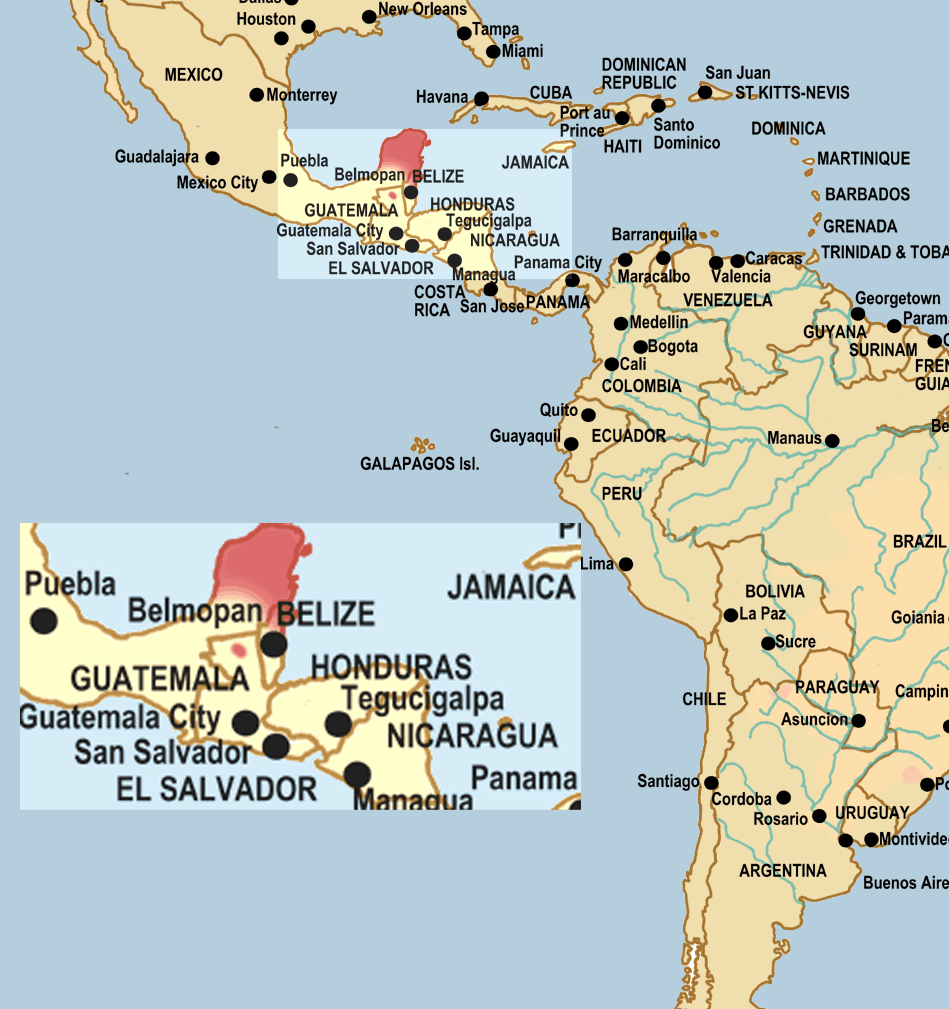

Synonyms
- Crotalus durissus tzabcan Klauber, 1952; Crotalus durissus tzabcan Neill & Allen, 1959; Crotalus simus tzabcan — Campbell & Lamar, 2004; Crotalus tzabcan — Quijada-Mascareñas & Wüster, 2006; Caudisona tzabcan — Hoser, 2009; Crotalus tzabcan — Wallach et al. 2014

= Crotalus tzabcan =

Species of viper

Crotalus tzabcan, the Yucatán neotropical rattlesnake, is a species of pit viper in the family Viperidae. It was previously thought to be a subspecies of Crotalus durissus, until Wüster elevated it to species status in 2005.

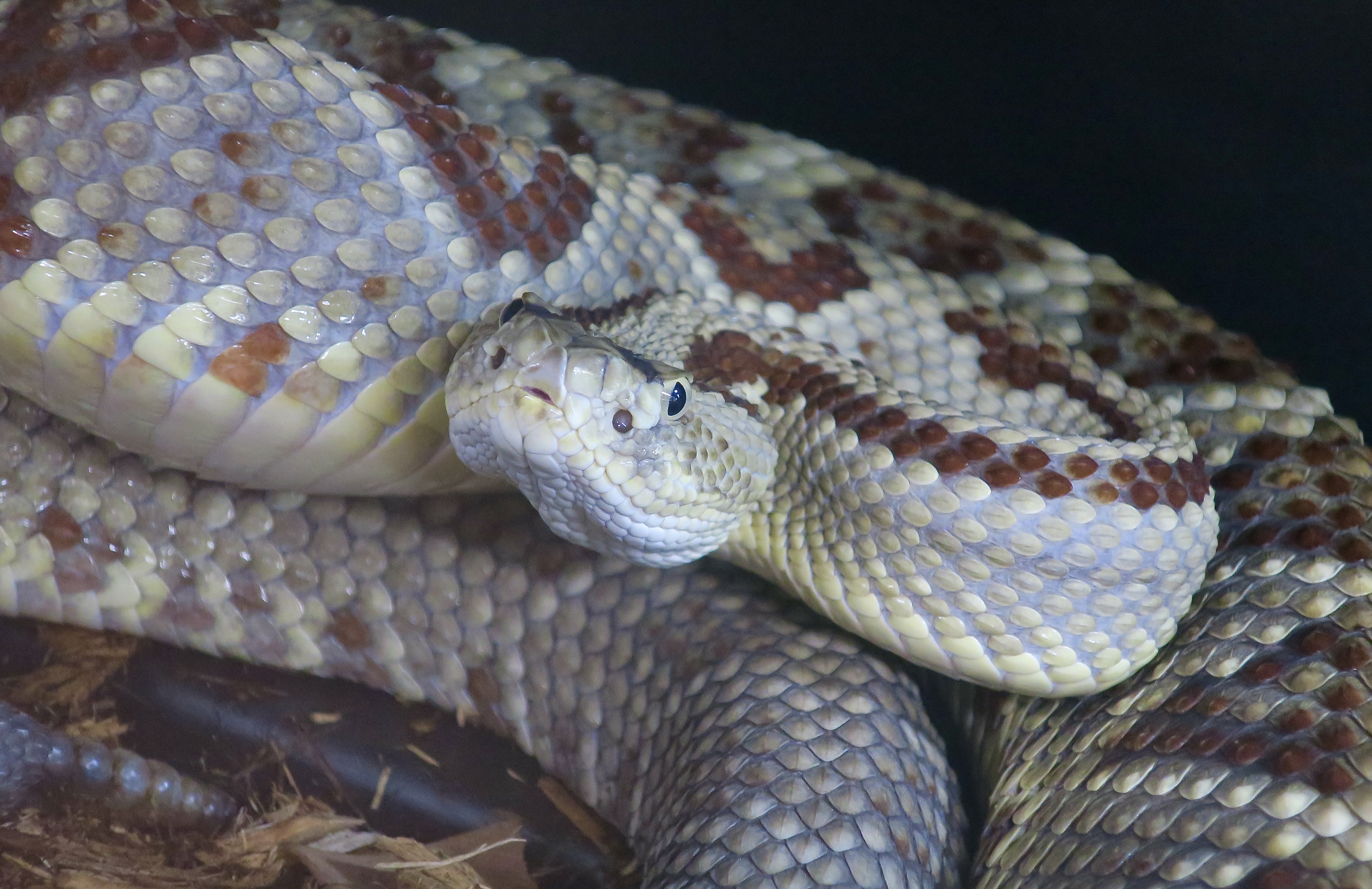
A Yucatán neotropical rattlesnake at Rattlesnake Ranch, Arizona.
