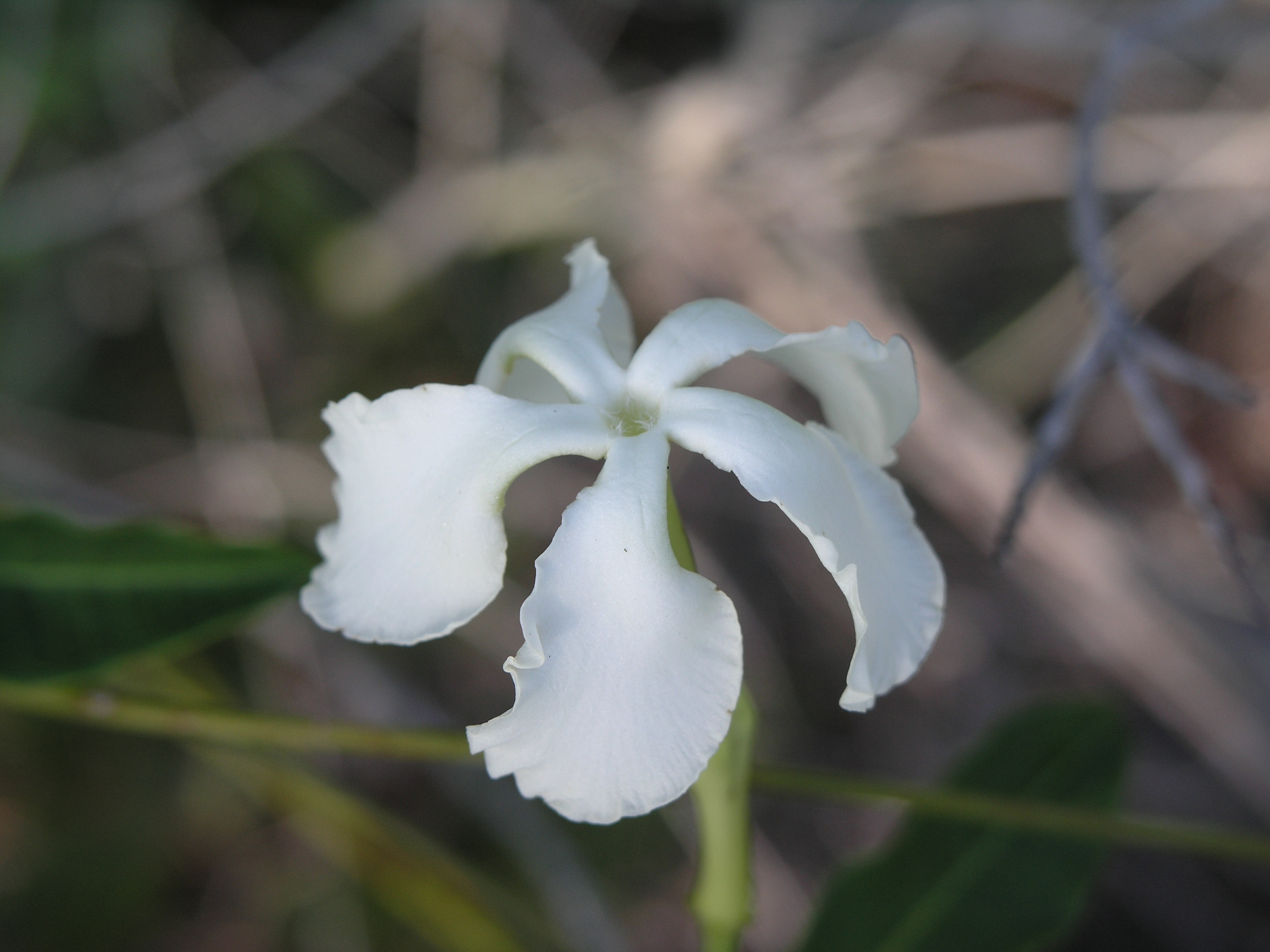

Scientific classification
- Kingdom: Plantae
- Clade: Tracheophytes
- Clade: Angiosperms
- Clade: Eudicots
- Clade: Asterids
- Order: Gentianales
- Family: Apocynaceae
- Genus: Echites
- Species: E. umbellatus

Binomial name
- Echites umbellatus Jacq. (1760)

= Echites umbellatus =

Species of flowering plant

Echites umbellatus is a flowering climber, belonging to subfamily Apocynoideae of the family Apocynaceae and has the English common name devil's potato. It was first described in 1760 by Dutch botanist, Nikolaus Joseph von Jacquin. The species grows in parts of Florida, Tabasco, Yucatán Peninsula, Belize, Honduras, Cayman Islands, Cuba, Hispaniola, Jamaica, Leeward Islands, Bahamas, Turks and Caicos Islands, and the Colombian islands in the Western Caribbean.

It is a perennial with white flowers and is toxic, containing lycopsamine-type pyrrolizidine alkaloids. Disease associated with consumption of PAs is known as pyrrolizidine alkaloidosis and many such alkaloids exhibit hepatotoxicity i.e. can cause severe liver damage, including hepatic veno-occlusive disease and liver cancer They are also tumorigenic.
