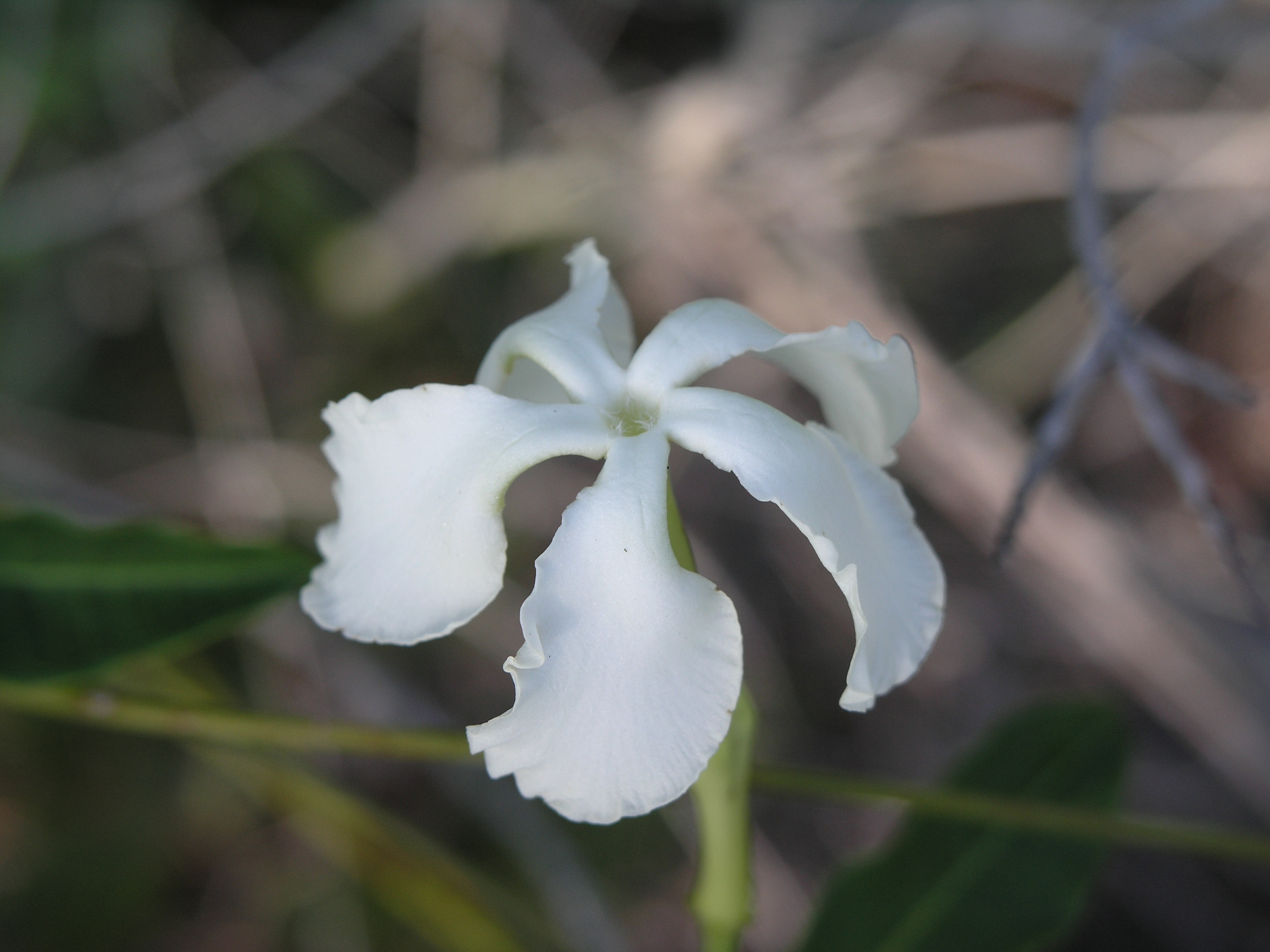
- Echites umbellatus

Scientific classification
- Kingdom: Plantae
- Clade: Tracheophytes
- Clade: Angiosperms
- Clade: Eudicots
- Clade: Asterids
- Order: Gentianales
- Family: Apocynaceae
- Subfamily: Apocynoideae
- Tribe: Echiteae
- Genus: Echites; P.Browne (1756)

Synonyms
- Allotoonia J.F.Morales & J.K.Williams (2004); Echithes Thunb. (1818), orth. var.; Fernaldia Woodson (1932)

= Echites =

Genus of plants

Echites is a genus of flowering plants in the family Apocynaceae, first described as a genus in 1756. It is primarily native to Mexico, Central America, the West Indies, and the US State of Florida.

Species

Over 500 names have been published for species, subspecies, and varieties within Echites, but most have been relegated to synonymy or moved to other genera. 14 species are currently accepted.

1. Echites agglutinatus Jacq. - Cuba, Hispaniola, Jamaica, Puerto Rico, Leeward Islands
2. Echites asperoglottis (Woodson) J.F.Morales, M.E.Endress & Liede – Mexico (México State, Michoacán, and Guerrero)
3. Echites brevipedunculatus Lippold - Cuba
4. Echites cajalbanicus Lippold - Cuba
5. Echites candelarianus J.F.Morales - Costa Rica
6. Echites darienensis J.F.Morales - Panama
7. Echites panduratus A.DC. – northeastern Mexico to Costa Rica
8. Echites puntarenensis J.F.Morales - Guatemala, Honduras, El Salvador, Nicaragua, Costa Rica
9. Echites speciosissimus (Woodson) J.F.Morales, M.E.Endress & Liede – Costa Rica and Panama
10. Echites turbinatus Woodson - Chiapas, Costa Rica, Honduras, Panama
11. Echites tuxtlensis Standl. - Chiapas, Yucatán Peninsula, Belize, Guatemala, El Salvador, Honduras
12. Echites umbellatus Jacq. - Tabasco, Yucatán Peninsula, Belize, Honduras, Cayman Islands, Cuba, Hispaniola, Jamaica, Leeward Islands, Bahamas, Florida, Turks & Caicos Islands, Colombian islands in the Western Caribbean
13. Echites woodsonianus Monach. - Michoacán, Guerrero, Chiapas, Guatemala, Honduras, Nicaragua, Costa Rica
14. Echites yucatanensis Millsp. ex Standl. - Belize, Guatemala, Nicaragua, Honduras, El Salvador, Jalisco, Guerrero, Tabasco, Yucatán Peninsula
