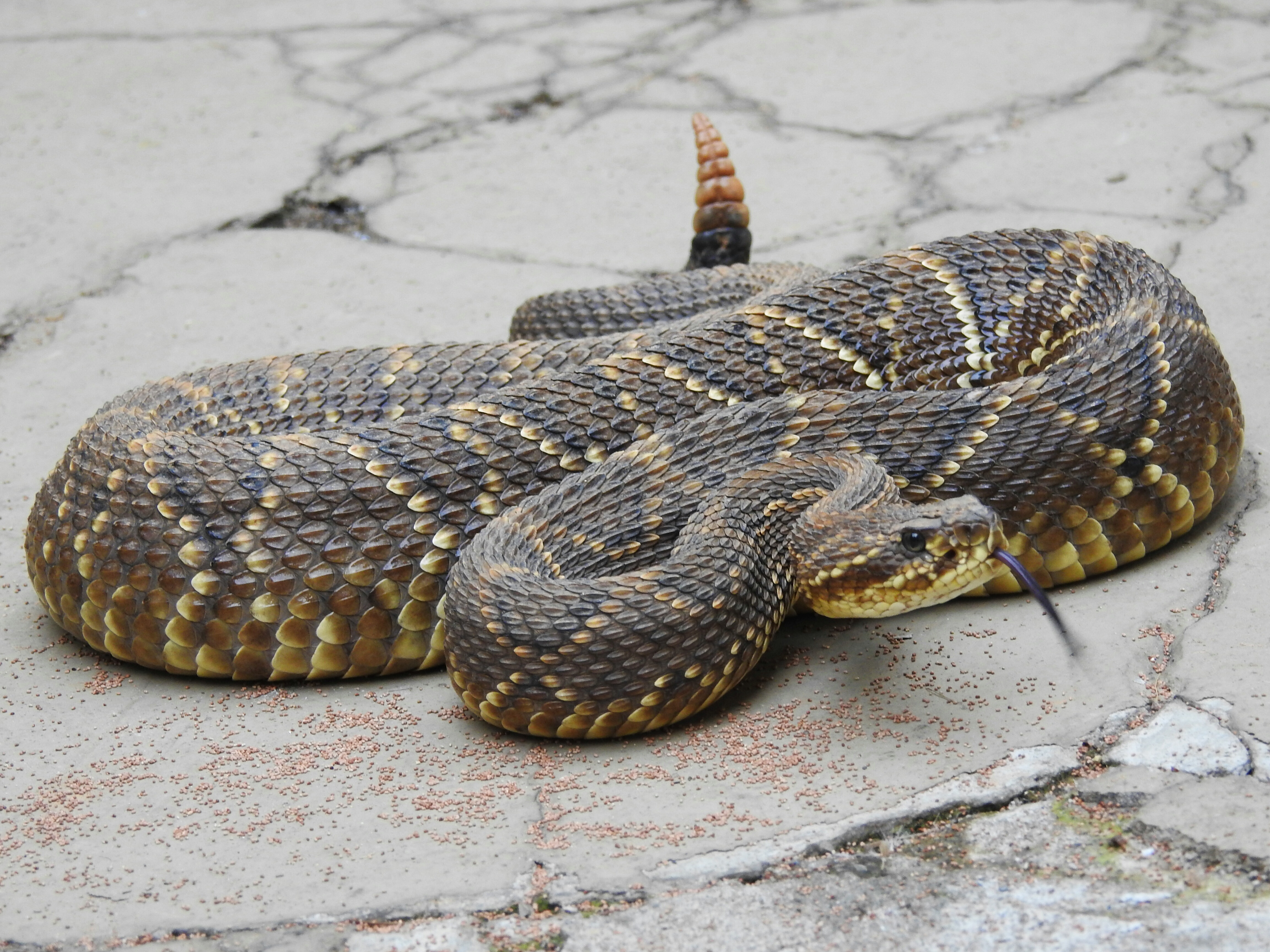
- C. d. terrificus

Conservation status
- Least Concern (IUCN 3.1)

Scientific classification
- Kingdom: Animalia
- Phylum: Chordata
- Class: Reptilia
- Order: Squamata
- Suborder: Serpentes
- Family: Viperidae
- Genus: Crotalus
- Species: C. durissus

Binomial name
- Crotalus durissus Linnaeus, 1758
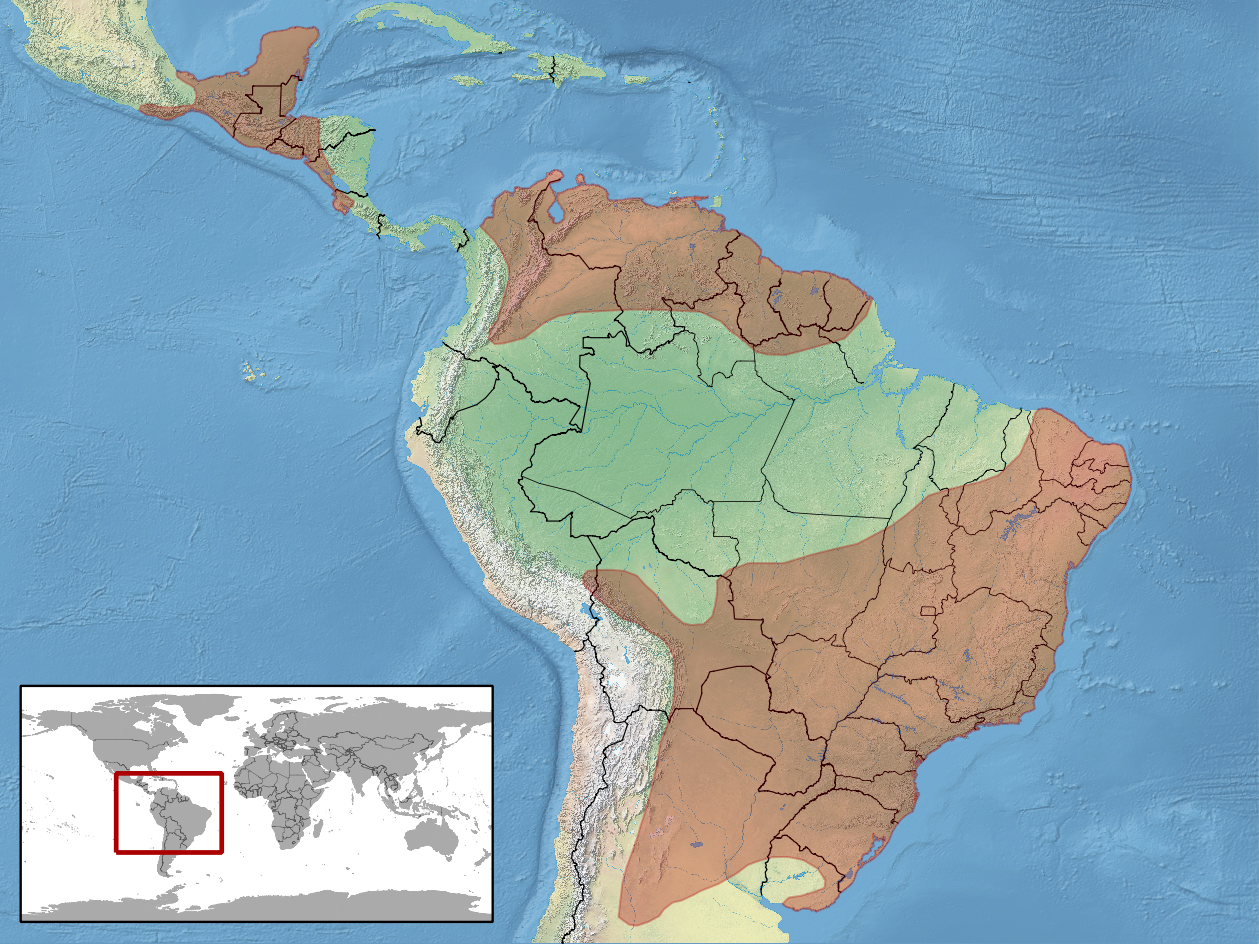

Synonyms
- Crotalus Dryinas Linnaeus, 1758; [Crotalus] Durissus – Linnaeus, 1758; Caudisona orientalis – Laurenti, 1768; Caudisona Gronovii – Laurenti, 1768; Crotalus orientalis – Gmelin, 1788; Crotalus strepitans var. dryinas – Daudin, 1803; [Urocrotalon] durissus – Fitzinger, 1843; Uropsophus durissus – Gray, 1849; Crotalus durissus – Boulenger, 1896; Crotalus pulvis – Ditmars, 1905; [Crotalus] terrificus durissus – Amaral, 1929; Crotalus terrificus durissus – Amaral, 1929; [Crotalus] Gronovii – Klauber, 1936; Crotalus durissus dryinus – Hoge, 1966; Crotalus (Crotalus) durissus dryinus – J. Peters & Orejas-Miranda, 1970

= Crotalus durissus =

South American rattlesnake

Species of snake

Crotalus durissus, known as the South American rattlesnake, tropical rattlesnake, and by other names, is a highly venomous pit viper species found in South America. It is the most widely distributed member of its genus. Currently, seven subspecies are recognized.

== Taxonomy ==
The Guiana rattlesnake, previously recognized as C. d. dryinus, is now considered a synonym for C. d. durissus. In fact, after the previous nominate subspecies for the C. d. durissus complex became the current nominate for Crotalus simus, which now represents its Mexican and Central American members, C. d. dryinus became the new nominate for the South American rattlesnakes as represented by C. durissus. The subspecies previously known as C. d. collilineatus and C. d. cascavella were moved to the synonymy of C. d. terrificus following the publication of a paper by Wüster et al. in 2005.

=== Subspecies ===
| Subspecies | Taxon author | Common name | Geographic range |
|---|---|---|---|
| C. d. cumanensis | Humboldt, 1833 | Venezuelan rattlesnake (Note: Mehrtens JM. 1987. Living Snakes of the World in Color. New York: Sterling Publishers. 480 pp. ISBN 0-8069-6460-X.) | Dry lowlands of Venezuela and Colombia |
| C. d. durissus | Linnaeus, 1758 | South American rattlesnake (Note: Campbell JA, Lamar WW. 2004. The Venomous Reptiles of the Western Hemisphere. Comstock Publishing Associates, Ithaca and London. 870 pp. 1500 plates. ISBN 0-8014-4141-2.) | Coastal savannas of Guyana, French Guiana and Suriname |
| C. d. marajoensis | Hoge, 1966 | Marajon rattlesnake (Note: Brown JH. 1973. Toxicology and Pharmacology of Venoms from Poisonous Snakes. Springfield, Illinois: Charles C. Thomas. 184 pp. LCCCN 73-229. ISBN 0-398-02808-7.) | Known only from Marajo Island, Para State, Brazil |
| C. d. maricelae | García Pérez, 1995 | | Bolson arido de Lagunillas, Estado Mérida, Venezuela |
| C. d. ruruima | Hoge, 1966 | | Known from the slopes of Mount Roraima and Mount Cariman-Perú in Venezuela (Bolívar). A few specimens have been recorded in Brazil (Roraima). |
| C. d. terrificus | (Laurenti, 1768) | Cascavel | Brazil south of the Amazonian forests, extreme southeastern Peru, Bolivia, Paraguay, Uruguay, northern Argentina |
| C. d. trigonicus | Harris & Simmons, 1978 | | Inland savannas of Guyana |

- Table notes:

== Description ==
A large Neotropical rattlesnake, it grows to a length of 1.5 m (4.9 ft), and rarely to a maximum length of 1.9 m (6.2 ft). It has two distinct stripes starting at the base of the head. Within the lines, the color is lighter than the stripes.

The color and pattern of the body are quite variable, most with an 18–32 dorsal with a darker diamond, and rhombic spots, 25–33 (usually 27) rows of dorsal scale in the middle of the body. The head has a dark brown bar at the top, with a dark post-orbital band. The color of the belly varies, it can be white or yellowish, with light gray spots, becoming darker towards the tail. The tail is usually gray, with dark and vague crossed bands.

== Behaviour ==
The species is more active at dusk and in the early hours of the morning; it is highly alert with little warning signs before striking, but like other rattlesnakes they are seldom aggressive towards humans.

== Reproduction ==
The South American rattlesnake has a seasonal reproductive cycle; competition between males (for access to females) begins around the summer's end, with copulation occurring during the fall, and the birth of the young taking place the following spring/summer. Reproduction is ovoviviparous, giving birth to four to eight young. In Roraima, Brazil it has been reported that the gestation lasts for five months, and they are capable of giving birth to up to 14 young.

== Diet ==
The diet consists mainly of rodents, likely due to the great abundance and availability of these animals throughout the year, in most areas where the snakes reside. In some regions, lizards of the Teiidae family are also part of the diet of C. durissus.

== Common names ==
Common names for the species include: South American rattlesnake, tropical rattler, tropical rattlesnake, neotropical rattlesnake, Guiana rattlesnake (previously used for C. d. dryinus). and in Spanish: víbora de cascabel, cascabel, cascabela, and also in Portuguese, cascavel. In Suriname it is known as Sakasneki.

== Geographic range ==
Crotalus durissus is found in South America except the Andes Mountains. However, its range is discontinuous, with many isolated populations in northern South America, including Colombia, Venezuela, Guyana, Suriname, French Guiana and northern Brazil. It occurs in Colombia and eastern Brazil to southeastern Peru, Bolivia, Paraguay, Uruguay, and northern Argentina (Catamarca, Córdoba, Corrientes, Chaco, Entre Rios, Formosa, La Pampa, La Rioja, Mendoza, Misiones, San Juan, San Luis, Santa Fe, Santiago del Estero and Tucumán). It also occurs on some islands in the Caribbean, including Aruba. The type locality given is "America."

== Habitat ==
It prefers savanna and semi-arid zones. It has been reported to occur in littoral xerophilous scrub, psammophilous and halophilous littoral grassland, thorny xerophilous scrub, tropophilous deciduous and semideciduous scrub, as well as tropophilous seasonal semideciduous forest in the northwest of Venezuela. In the Chaco region of Paraguay, it is found in the drier, sandier areas.

== Venom ==
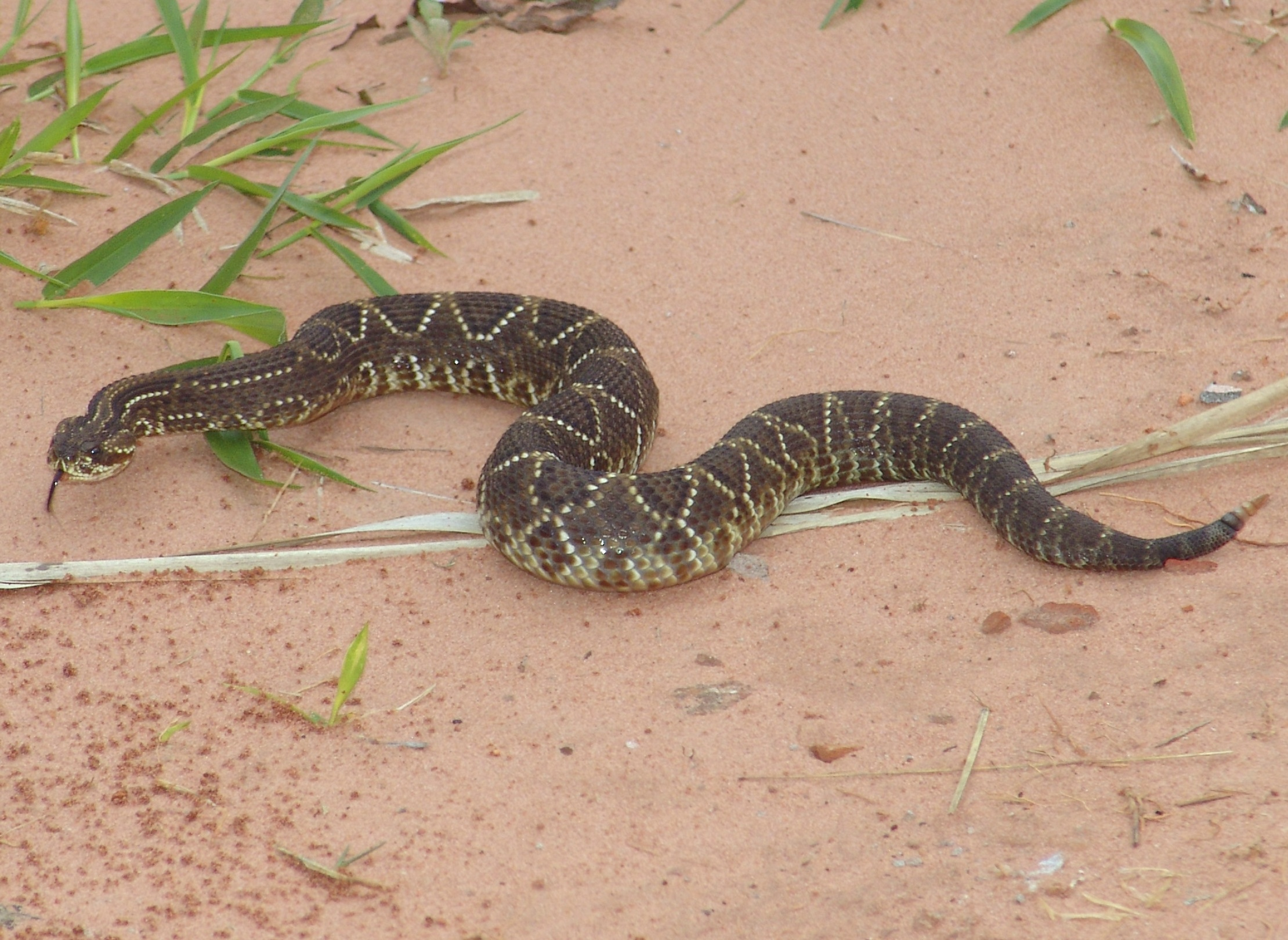
C. d. terrificus in Avaré, São Paulo, Brazil

Bite symptoms are very different from those of Nearctic species due to the presence of neurotoxins (PLA_{2}s like crotoxin and myotoxins like crotamine) that cause progressive paralysis. Bites from C. d. terrificus in particular can result in impaired vision or complete blindness, auditory disorders, ptosis, paralysis of the peripheral muscles, especially of the neck, which becomes so limp as to appear broken, and eventually life-threatening respiratory paralysis. The ocular disturbances are sometimes followed by permanent blindness. Phospholipase A_{2} neurotoxins also cause damage to skeletal muscles and possibly the heart, causing general aches, pain, and tenderness throughout the body. Myoglobin released into the blood results in dark urine. Other serious complications may result from systemic disorders (incoagulable blood and general spontaneous bleeding), hypotension, and shock. Hemorrhagins may be present in the venom, but any corresponding effects are completely overshadowed by the startling and serious neurotoxic symptoms. Acute renal failure is considered as the main cause of death. The mortality rate of cases without specific serum treatment is 72%, and 11% in cases with specific treatment.

According to Consroe et al. (1992), the LD50 value of the whole venom from C. durissus terrificus and C. durissus durissus is 0.13 mg/kg IV and 1.79 mg/kg IV respectively, using standardized methods with ICR/CD-1 female mice (outbred stock). Glenn and Straight also report LD50 values of 0.19 mg/kg IV, 0.25 mg/kg IP, and 1.4 mg/kg SC for C. durissus terrificus, and 1.43 mg/kg IV and 0.71 IP for C. durissus durissus . Sanchez et al. (1992) report LD50 of male CF_{2} mice (outbred stock) of 0.093 mg/kg IV and 0.0485 mg/kg IP in C. durissus collilineatus, and 0.0965-0.27 mg/kg IV and 0.092-0.141 mg/kg IP in various populations of C. durissus terrificus (C. d. collilineatus now synonymous with C. d. terrificus). Lima et al. (1991) reported on SC median lethal dose for whole venom of C. d. terrificus on inbred mouse strains: 0.193 and 0.171 mg/kg for Balb/c and C57BI/6 mice respectively, and 0.078 and 0.074 mg/kg for A/J and DBA/J mice respectively. The LD50 of purified crotoxin is variously reported at 0.047 and 0.061 mg/kg IV in male and female CDC mice (outbred stock) respectively, and 0.09 mg/kg IP.

The lethal dose for 60 kg humans is possibly 18 mg, while the venom yield is 20-100 mg. Sanchez et al also reported venom yield of 76 mg average (28-127 mg range) for C. durissus collilineatus, and 50 mg average (28-67 mg range) for C. durissus terrificus. Roodt et al. (1998) reported an average venom yield of 140 mg for C. durissus terrificus snakes weighing an average of 1.9 kg (ranging from 0.69-3.2 kg), with an average of 7.39 (SD of 1.13) mg of venom per 100 grams of body weight.

Crotoxin makes up anywhere from 48.5-89.4% of C. durissus terrificus venoms total proteome, though is typically 60-70% depending on locality. Crotalus durissus collilineatus and C. durissus cascavella (both synonymous with C. durissus terrificus) crotoxin abundance is also reported at 67.4% (72% PLA_{2} total) and 72.5% (90.6% PLA_{2} total) respectively. The myotoxin crotamine is also usually absent or present at various levels in C. durissus terrificus and C. durissus collilineatus; crotamine appears to be absent in C. durissus cascavella.

Crotalus durissus cumanensis has lower levels of neurotoxicity than the previously discussed subspecies, with PLA_{2}s representing 32-44% of venom proteome across various populations. Some populations can also have very high abundance of crotamine, up to 55%, whereas others might have no crotamine.

Crotalus durissus ruruima are highly dichotomous, showcasing Type I (hemorrhagic with 33% SVMP (snake venom metalloproteinases) and 10% PLA_{2}), and Type II (neurotoxic with 21% PLA_{2} and 11% SVMP). Historically, yellow colored venom was associated with hemorrhagic Type I while white colored venom was associated with neurotoxic Type II. But the color of the venom is determined by the abundance of LAAO and cofactor pigments, which don't determine whether a venom is Type I or Type II.
