= Myolysis =

Myolysis is the destruction or otherwise breakdown of muscle tissue. It is used as a medical procedure in the treatment of fibroids, particularly of the uterus.

== Medical usage ==
Myolysis involves the application of some energy source directed at fibroids, intended to stop blood flow and cause necrosis of the tumorous tissue while not damaging the surrounding tissue. Some of the methods used to achieve myolysis include application of heat (laser myolysis, myoma coagulation), cold (cryomyolysis), and focused ultrasound energy. The procedures involving the application of extreme heat or cold are typically performed laparoscopically.

Myolysis may result in pregnancy complications, such as uterine scarring, a weak uterine wall, or infection. It is not recommended for women who are pregnant or who may wish to become pregnant.

=== Laparoscopic myolysis ===
In laparoscopic myolysis, a small needle is inserted near the fibroid, and the tip of the needle is either heated or cooled to extreme temperatures, then applied to the fibroid until all the tumorous tissue has been treated. One example of this is laser myolysis, in which a laser is used entirely remove the fibroid, or otherwise clot the blood flow to the fibroid, causing it to die. Another example is cryomyolysis, where a cryogenic gas (typically liquid nitrogen) is used to cool the tip of the needle, which freezes the fibroid.

Myoma coagulation is another method for myolysis, in which an electric current is passed through a needle and into the fibroid, subjecting it to high temperatures.

== Other causes ==
Many venomous snakes can produce myotoxins in their venom, causing myolysis either locally, at the site of a bite, or systemically throughout the body. This can cause muscle pain, weakness, and myoglobinuria (with the color of urine varying from a deep red to a muddy brown), symptoms which can take several hours or days to manifest. Severe myolysis may in turn result in hyperkalemia, as the breakdown of muscle releases excessive potassium into the bloodstream. Methods for identifying myolysis after such a snakebite can include testing for creatine kinase levels, which may be elevated, or evaluating myoglobin levels.

Treatment with antivenom theoretically has little effect once myolysis has set in; however, even late antivenom treatment may still reduce the severity of injury. Since snake myotoxins primarily target individual muscle cells, muscle regeneration is possible, starting ~3 days after being bitten, and typically taking ~28 days to complete.

== See also ==
- Rhabdomyolysis, the breakdown of skeletal muscle
