= Lists of snakes =

List of snakes refers to a variety of different articles and different criteria. These are listed below.

== Lists ==
=== General lists ===
- General lists:
  - Snake § Taxonomy
  - List of reptile genera § Order Squamata
  - List of snakes by common name
  - List of snakes by scientific name

=== Lists by special criteria ===
- Lists by genus:
  - List of pythonid species and subspecies
  - List of Serpentes families
  - List of viperine species and subspecies
- By other characteristics:
  - List of dangerous snakes
  - List of largest snakes
- By region:
  - List of snakes of Jordan
  - List of snakes in North Macedonia
  - Snakes of Nigeria
  - List of snakes of Spain
  - List of snakes of Trinidad and Tobago
  - Category:Lists of snakes of the United States (lists by U.S. state)
