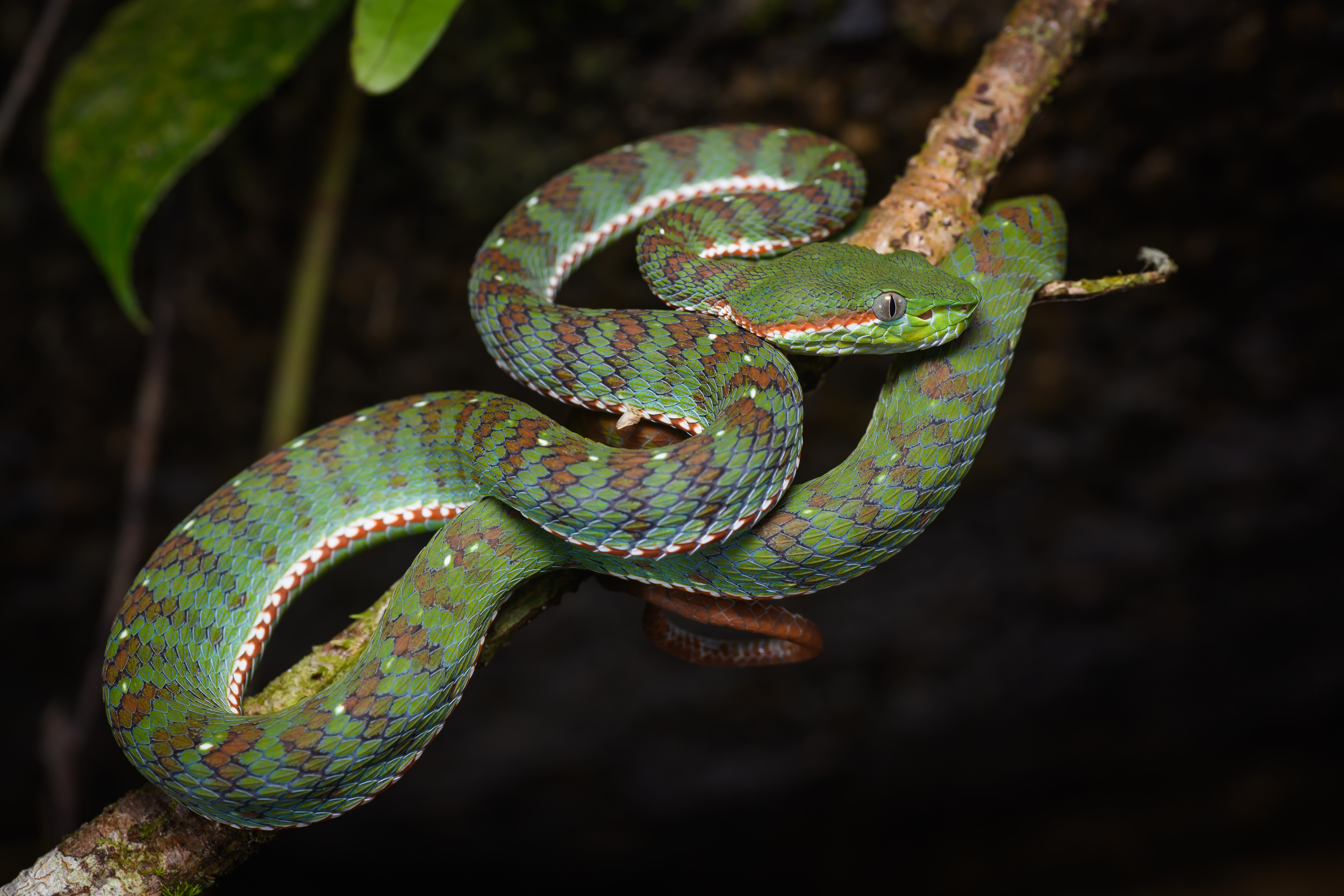
- Trimeresurus sabahi

Scientific classification
- Kingdom: Animalia
- Phylum: Chordata
- Class: Reptilia
- Order: Squamata
- Clade: Toxicofera
- Clade: Ophidia
- Suborder: Serpentes; Linnaeus, 1758

Infraorders
- Alethinophidia Nopcsa, 1923; Scolecophidia Cope, 1864
- Approximate world distribution of snakes, all species

= Snake =

Snake Temporal range: Late Cretaceous – Present, 94–0 Ma

Limbless, scaly, elongate reptile

Snakes are limbless reptiles of the squamate suborder Serpentes. Closely related to lizards and the tuatara, snakes are ectothermic, amniote, air-breathing vertebrates with an elongated rope-like body covered by overlapping scales, and they move around using undulatory, rectilinear, concertina, sidewinding or slide-pushing locomotion, with some arboreal species even capable of short-ranged gliding flight by flaring out the ribs to flatten and widen the body for aerodynamic lift. Snakes have skulls with significantly fewer sutures and more hypermobile articulations (i.e. cranial kinesis) than their lizard relatives, enabling them to greatly widen the mouth and swallow prey much larger than their heads. To accommodate their narrow bodies, snakes' paired organs (such as kidneys) appear one in front of the other instead of side by side, and most only have one functional lung. Despite being tetrapods from a cladistic prospective, snakes lack limbs completely, although pythons and boids retain a vestigial pelvic girdle. Some lizards have also independently evolved a snake-like elongated body without limbs or with greatly reduced limbs at least twenty-five times via convergent evolution, leading to many lineages of legless lizards, who have eyelids, external ears and a fleshy non-forked tongue that snakes lack, although this rule is not universal.

Snakes are mostly terrestrial with a cosmopolitan distribution, and extant species are found on every continent except Antarctica, and on most islands — exceptions include Ireland, Iceland, Greenland and the islands of New Zealand, as well as many small islands of the Atlantic and Central Pacific oceans. Additionally, secondarily aquatic groups such as the sea snakes are widespread throughout the Indo-Pacific regions, while water snakes are found worldwide. Around thirty families are currently recognized, comprising about 520 genera and about more than 4,170 species. They range in size from the tiny, 10.4 cm-long (4.1 in) Barbados threadsnake to the reticulated python up to 6.95 m (22.8 ft) in length. The fossil species Titanoboa cerrejonensis was 12.8 meters (42 ft) long. Snakes are thought to have evolved from either burrowing or aquatic lizards, perhaps during the Jurassic period, with the earliest known fossils dating to between 143 and 167 Ma ago. The diversity of modern snakes appeared during the Paleocene epoch (c. 66 to 56 Ma ago, after the Cretaceous–Paleogene extinction event). The oldest preserved descriptions of snakes can be found in the Brooklyn Medical Papyrus.

Most species of snake are non-venomous, and venomous snake species use their venom primarily to paralyze and kill prey rather than for self-defense. Snake venom is delivered during biting via hollow/grooved fangs and contains a wide variety of toxins including neurotoxins, hemotoxins, cardiotoxins and myotoxins, and some are potent enough to cause severe injury or death to humans with just one snakebite. Non-venomous snakes typically subdue prey by constriction before either swallow the prey alive or kill it by strangulation before swallowing whole. In captivity, snakes are typically fed dead prey because live foods such as rodents may fight and injure snakes during feeding.

== Etymology ==
The English word snake comes from Old English snaca, itself from Proto-Germanic *snak-an- (cf. Swedish snok 'grass snake'), from Proto-Indo-European root *(s)nēg-o- 'to crawl to creep', which also gave sneak as well as Sanskrit nāgá 'snake'. The word ousted adder, as adder went on to narrow in meaning, though in Old English næddre was the general word for snake. The other term, serpent, is from French, ultimately from Indo-European *serp- 'to creep', which also gave Ancient Greek ἕρπω (hérpō) 'I crawl' and Sanskrit sarpá 'snake'.

== Taxonomy ==
All modern snakes are grouped within the suborder Serpentes in Linnean taxonomy, part of the order Squamata, though their precise placement within squamates remains controversial.

The two infraorders of Serpentes are Alethinophidia and Scolecophidia. This separation is based on morphological characteristics and mitochondrial DNA sequence similarity. Alethinophidia is sometimes split into Henophidia and Caenophidia, with the latter consisting of "colubroid" snakes (colubrids, vipers, elapids, hydrophiids, and atractaspids) and acrochordids, while the other alethinophidian families comprise Henophidia. While not extant today, the Madtsoiidae, a family of giant, primitive, python-like snakes, lived until 50,000 years ago in Australia, represented by genera such as Wonambi.

Recent molecular studies support the monophyly of the clades of modern snakes, scolecophidians, typhlopids + anomalepidids, alethinophidians, core alethinophidians, uropeltids (Cylindrophis, Anomochilus, uropeltines), macrostomatans, booids, boids, pythonids and caenophidians.

=== Families ===
Infraorder Alethinophidia 25 families
Family	Taxon author	Genera	Species	Common name	Geographic range
Acrochordidae	Bonaparte, 1831	1	3	Wart snakes	Western India and Sri Lanka through tropical Southeast Asia to the Philippines, south through the Indonesian/Malaysian island group to Timor, east through New Guinea to the northern coast of Australia to Mussau Island, the Bismarck Archipelago and Guadalcanal Island in the Solomon Islands.
Aniliidae	Stejneger, 1907	1	1	False coral snake	Tropical South America.
Anomochilidae	Cundall, Wallach, 1993	1	3	Dwarf pipe snakes	West Malaysia and on the Indonesian island of Sumatra.
Atractaspididae	Günther, 1858	12	72	Burrowing asps	Africa and the Middle East
Boidae	Gray, 1825	14	61	Boas	Northern, Central and South America, the Caribbean, southeastern Europe and Asia Minor, Northern, Central and East Africa, Madagascar and Reunion Island, the Arabian Peninsula, Central and southwestern Asia, India and Sri Lanka, the Moluccas and New Guinea through to Melanesia and Samoa.
Bolyeriidae	Hoffstetter, 1946	2	2	Splitjaw snakes	Mauritius.
Colubridae	Oppel, 1811	258	2055	Typical snakes	Widespread on all continents, except Antarctica.
Cyclocoridae	Weinell & Brown, 2017	5	8	Cyclocorids	The Philippines
Cylindrophiidae	Fitzinger, 1843	1	14	Asian pipe snakes	Sri Lanka east through Myanmar, Thailand, Cambodia, Vietnam and the Malay Archipelago to as far east as Aru Islands off the southwestern coast of New Guinea. Also found in southern China (Fujian, Hong Kong and on Hainan Island) and in Laos.
Elapidae	Boie, 1827	55	389	Elapids	On land, worldwide in tropical and subtropical regions, except in Europe. Sea snakes occur in the Indian Ocean and the Pacific.
Homalopsidae	Bonaparte, 1845	28	53	Homalopsids	Southeastern Asia and northern Australia.
Lamprophiidae	Fitzinger, 1843	16	89	Lamprophiids (formerly included Atracaspididae, Psammophiidae, and several other families)	Africa (including the Seychelles)
Loxocemidae	Cope, 1861	1	1	Mexican burrowing snake	Along the Pacific versant from Mexico south to Costa Rica.
Micrelapidae	Das et al., 2023	1	4	Two-headed snakes	Eastern Africa and the Levant
Pareidae	Romer, 1956	3	20	Snail-eating snakes	Southeast Asia and islands on the Sunda Shelf (Sumatra, Borneo, Java, and their surrounding smaller islands).
Prosymnidae	Kelly, Barker, Villet & Broadley, 2009	1	16	Shovel-snout snakes	Subsaharan Africa
Psammodynastidae	Das et al., 2024	1	2	Mock vipers	Tropical Asia
Psammophiidae	Bourgeois, 1968	8	55	Psammophiids	Africa (including Madagascar), Asia and southern Europe
Pseudaspididae	Cope, 1893	2	2	Pseudaspidids	Subsaharan Africa
Pseudoxyrhophiidae	Dowling, 1975	22	89	Pseudoxyrhophiids	Mostly Madagascar and the Comoros; 5 species in subsaharan Africa, 1 in Socotra
Pythonidae	Fitzinger, 1826	8	40	Pythons	Subsaharan Africa, India, Myanmar, southern China, Southeast Asia and from the Philippines southeast through Indonesia to New Guinea and Australia.
Tropidophiidae	Brongersma, 1951	2	34	Dwarf boas	West Indies; also Panama and northwestern South America, as well as in northwestern and southeastern Brazil.
Uropeltidae	Müller, 1832	8	55	Shield-tailed snakes	Southern India and Sri Lanka.
Viperidae	Oppel, 1811	35	341	Vipers	The Americas, Africa, and Eurasia east to Wallace's Line.
Xenodermidae	Cope, 1900	6	18	Dragon and odd-scaled snakes	East Asia, Southern and southeastern Asia, and islands on the Sunda Shelf (Sumatra, Borneo, Java, and their surrounding smaller islands).
Xenopeltidae	Bonaparte, 1845	1	2	Sunbeam snakes	Southeast Asia from the Andaman and Nicobar Islands, east through Myanmar to southern China, Thailand, Laos, Cambodia, Vietnam, the Malay Peninsula and the East Indies to Sulawesi, as well as the Philippines.
Xenophidiidae	Wallach & Günther, 1998	1	2	Spine-jawed snakes	Borneo and peninsular Malaysia.

Infraorder Scolecophidia 5 families
Family	Taxon author	Genera	Species	Common name	Geographic range
Anomalepidae	Taylor, 1939	4	18	Primitive blind snakes	From southern Central America to northwestern South America. Disjunct populations in northeastern and southeastern South America.
Gerrhopilidae	Vidal, Wynn, Donnellan and Hedges 2010	2	18	Indo-Malayan blindsnakes	Southern and southeastern Asia, including Sri Lanka, the Philippines, and New Guinea.
Leptotyphlopidae	Stejneger, 1892	13	139	Slender blind snakes	Africa, western Asia from Turkey to northwestern India, on Socotra Island, from the southwestern United States south through Mexico and Central to South America, though not in the high Andes. In Pacific South America they occur as far south as southern coastal Peru, and on the Atlantic side as far as Uruguay and Argentina. In the Caribbean they are found on the Bahamas, Hispaniola and the Lesser Antilles.
Typhlopidae	Merrem, 1820	18	266	Typical blind snakes	Most tropical and many subtropical regions around the world, particularly in Africa, Madagascar, Asia, islands in the Pacific, tropical America and in southeastern Europe.
Xenotyphlopidae	Vidal, Vences, Branch and Hedges 2010	1	1	Round-nosed blindsnake	Northern Madagascar.

=== Legless lizards ===
While snakes are limbless reptiles, evolved from (and grouped with) lizards, there are many other species of lizards that have lost their limbs independently but which superficially look similar to snakes. These include glass snakes (including the slowworm), and amphisbaenians.

=== Evolution ===
Unsolved problem in biology
Did snakes evolve from burrowing lizards or aquatic lizards?
More unsolved problems in biology

A family level phylogenetic overview of modern snakes.

Note: the tree only indicates relationships, not evolutionary branching times. This is not a definitive tree. It is the best that could be done as of 2024. See original paper for a discussion of difficulties.
- Snakes
  - Scolecophidia
    - Leptotyphlopidae
    - - Gerrhopilidae
      - - Typhlopidae
        - Xenotyphlopidae
  - - Anomalepididae
    - Alethinophidia
      - - - Aniliidae
          - Tropidophiidae
        - - - - - Xenopeltidae
              - - Loxocemidae
                - Pythonidae
            - - Boidae
              - - Bolyeridae
                - Xenophidiidae
          - - Uropeltidae
            - - Anomochilidae
              - Cylindrophiidae
      - - - Acrochordidae
        - - - Xenodermidae
          - - - Pareidae
            - - - Viperidae
              - - - Homalopsidae
                - - - Colubridae
                  - - Lamprophiidae
                    - Elapidae

The fossil record of snakes is relatively poor because snake skeletons are typically small and fragile making fossilization uncommon. Fossils readily identifiable as snakes (though often retaining hind limbs) first appear in the fossil record during the Cretaceous period. The earliest known true snake fossils (members of the crown group Serpentes) come from the marine simoliophiids, the oldest of which is the Late Cretaceous (Cenomanian age) Haasiophis terrasanctus from the West Bank, dated to between 112 and 94 million years old.

Based on genomic analysis it is certain that snakes descend from lizards. This conclusion is also supported by comparative anatomy, and the fossil record.

Pythons and boas—primitive groups among modern snakes—have vestigial hind limbs: tiny, clawed digits known as anal spurs, which are used to grasp during mating. The families Leptotyphlopidae and Typhlopidae also possess remnants of the pelvic girdle, appearing as horny projections when visible.

Front limbs are nonexistent in all known snakes. This is caused by the evolution of their Hox genes, controlling limb morphogenesis. The axial skeleton of the snakes' common ancestor, like most other tetrapods, had regional specializations consisting of cervical (neck), thoracic (chest), lumbar (lower back), sacral (pelvic), and caudal (tail) vertebrae. Early in snake evolution, the Hox gene expression in the axial skeleton responsible for the development of the thorax became dominant. As a result, the vertebrae anterior to the hindlimb buds (when present) all have the same thoracic-like identity (except from the atlas, axis, and 1–3 neck vertebrae). In other words, most of a snake's skeleton is an extremely extended thorax. Ribs are found exclusively on the thoracic vertebrae. Neck, lumbar and pelvic vertebrae are very reduced in number (only 2–10 lumbar and pelvic vertebrae are present), while only a short tail remains of the caudal vertebrae. However, the tail is still long enough to be of important use in many species, and is modified in some aquatic and tree-dwelling species.

Many modern snake groups originated during the Paleocene, alongside the adaptive radiation of mammals following the extinction of (non-avian) dinosaurs. The expansion of grasslands in North America also led to an explosive radiation among snakes. Previously, snakes were a minor component of the North American fauna, but during the Miocene, the number of species and their prevalence increased dramatically with the first appearances of vipers and elapids in North America and the significant diversification of Colubridae (including the origin of many modern genera such as Nerodia, Lampropeltis, Pituophis, and Pantherophis).

=== Fossils ===
There is fossil evidence to suggest that snakes may have evolved from burrowing lizards during the Cretaceous Period. An early fossil snake relative, Najash rionegrina, was a two-legged burrowing animal with a sacrum, and was fully terrestrial. Najash, which lived 95 million years ago, also had a skull with several features typical for lizards, but had evolved some of the mobile skull joints that define the flexible skull in most modern snakes. The species did not show any resemblances to the modern burrowing blind snakes, which have often been seen as the most primitive group of extant forms. One extant analog of these putative ancestors is the earless monitor Lanthanotus of Borneo (though it is also semiaquatic). Subterranean species evolved bodies streamlined for burrowing, and eventually lost their limbs. According to this hypothesis, features such as the transparent, fused eyelids (brille) and loss of external ears evolved to cope with fossorial difficulties, such as scratched corneas and dirt in the ears. Some primitive snakes are known to have possessed hindlimbs, but their pelvic bones lacked a direct connection to the vertebrae. These include fossil species like Haasiophis, Pachyrhachis and Eupodophis, which are slightly older than Najash.

This hypothesis was strengthened in 2015 by the discovery of a 113-million-year-old fossil of a four-legged snake in Brazil that has been named Tetrapodophis amplectus. It has many snake-like features, is adapted for burrowing and its stomach indicates that it was preying on other animals. It is currently uncertain if Tetrapodophis is a snake or another species, in the squamate order, as a snake-like body has independently evolved at least 26 times. Tetrapodophis does not have distinctive snake features in its spine and skull. A study in 2021 places the animal in a group of extinct marine lizards from the Cretaceous period known as dolichosaurs and not directly related to snakes.

An alternative hypothesis, based on morphology, suggests the ancestors of snakes were related to mosasaurs—extinct aquatic reptiles from the Cretaceous—forming the clade Pythonomorpha. According to this hypothesis, the fused, transparent eyelids of snakes are thought to have evolved to combat marine conditions (corneal water loss through osmosis), and the external ears were lost through disuse in an aquatic environment. This ultimately led to an animal similar to today's sea snakes. In the Late Cretaceous, snakes recolonized land, and continued to diversify into today's snakes. Fossilized snake remains are known from early Late Cretaceous marine sediments, which is consistent with this hypothesis; particularly so, as they are older than the terrestrial Najash rionegrina. Similar skull structure, reduced or absent limbs, and other anatomical features found in both mosasaurs and snakes lead to a positive cladistical correlation, although some of these features are shared with varanids.

Genetic studies in recent years have indicated snakes are not as closely related to monitor lizards as was once believed—and therefore not to mosasaurs, the proposed ancestor in the aquatic scenario of their evolution. However, more evidence links mosasaurs to snakes than to varanids. Fragmented remains found from the Jurassic and Early Cretaceous indicate deeper fossil records for these groups, which may potentially refute either hypothesis.

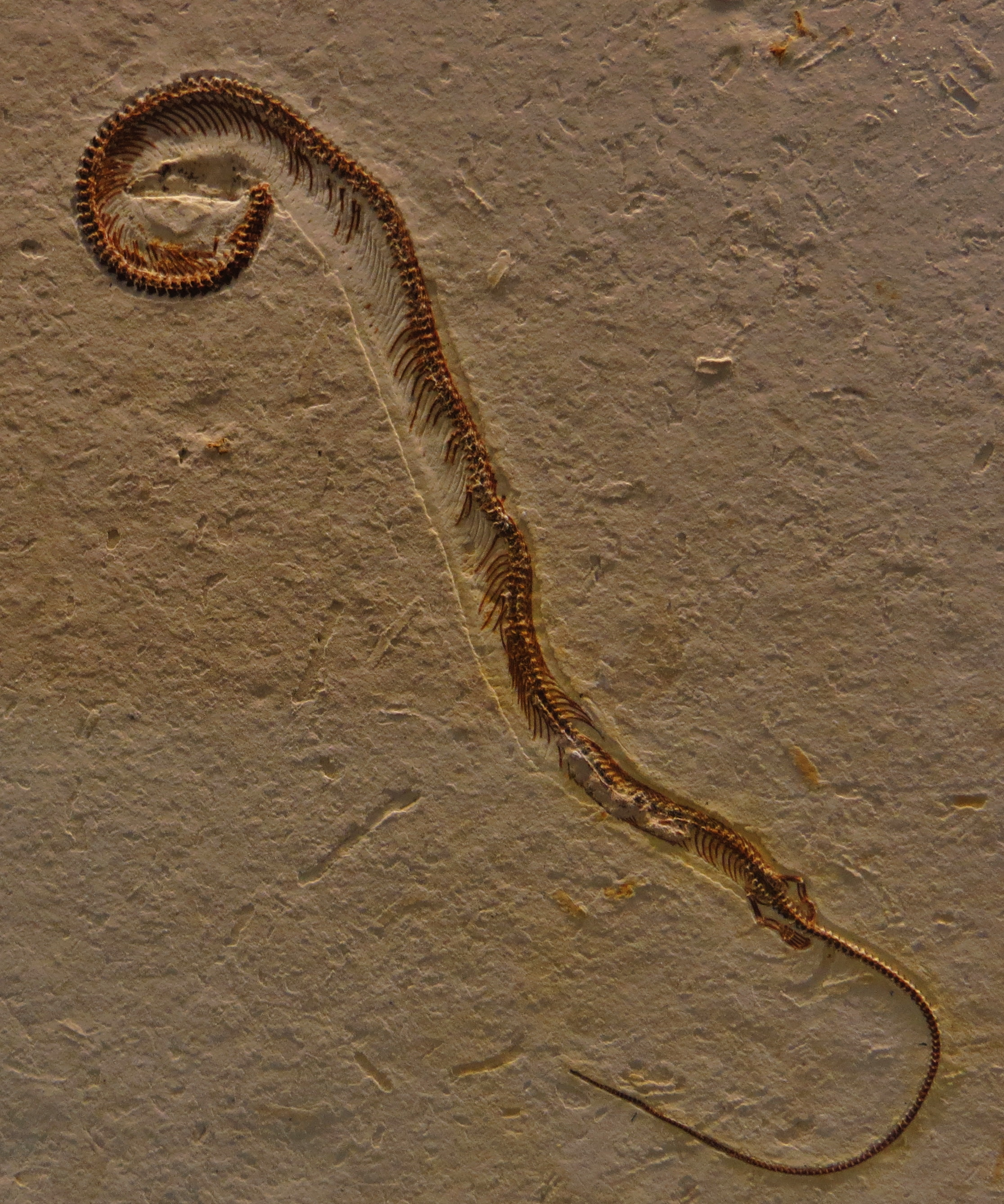
Tetrapodophis

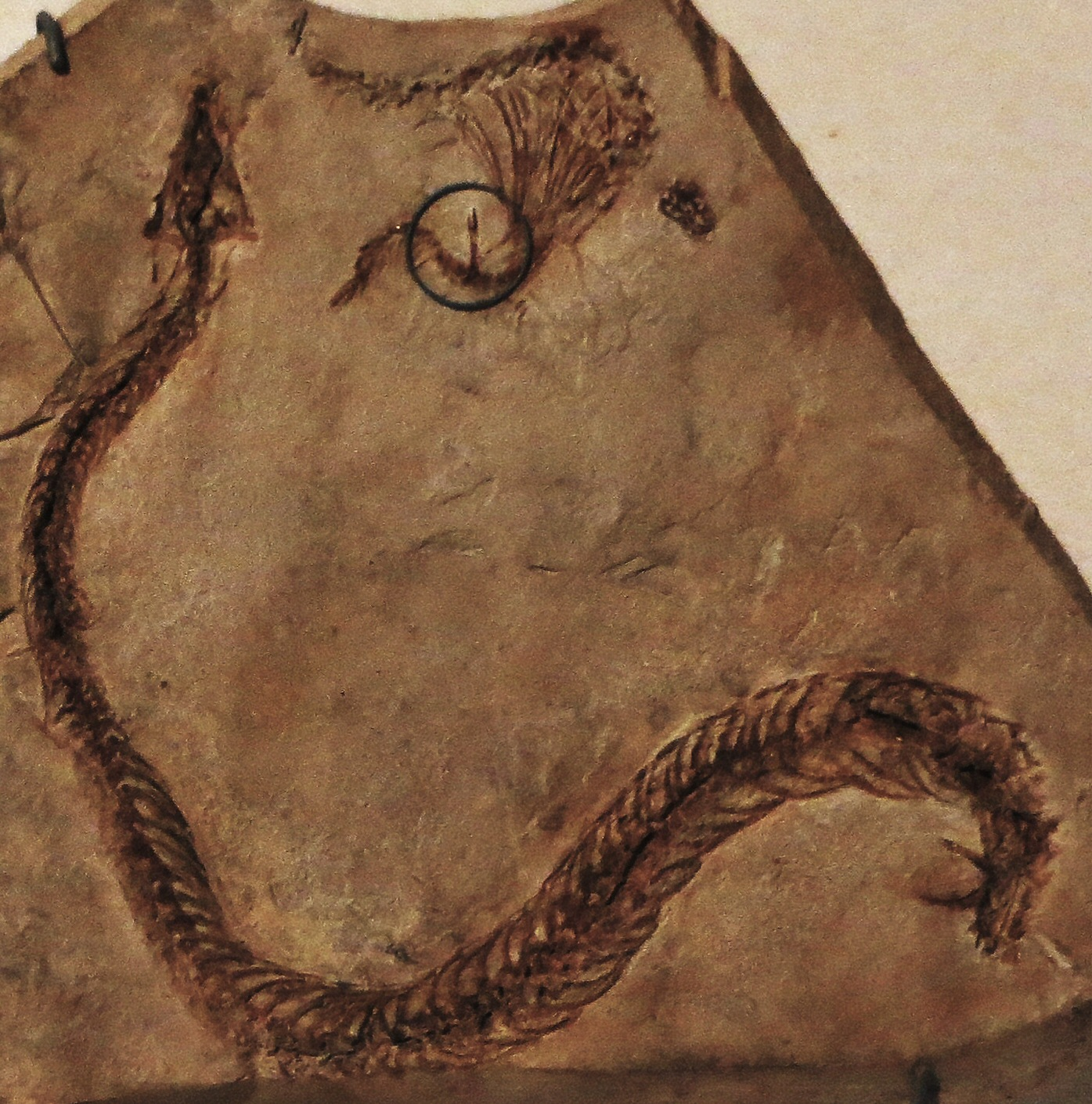
Eupodophis descouensi

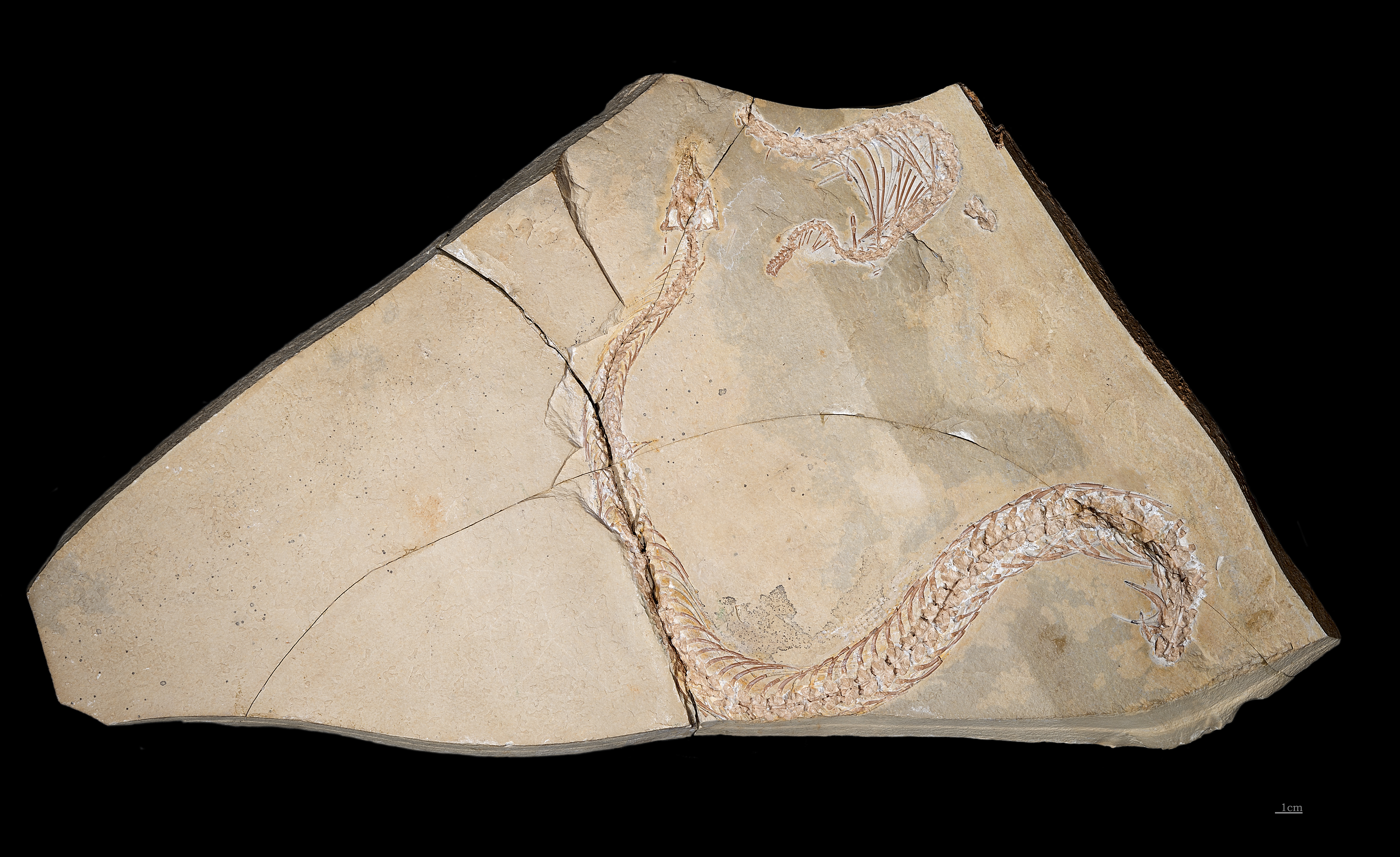
Eupodophis descouensi

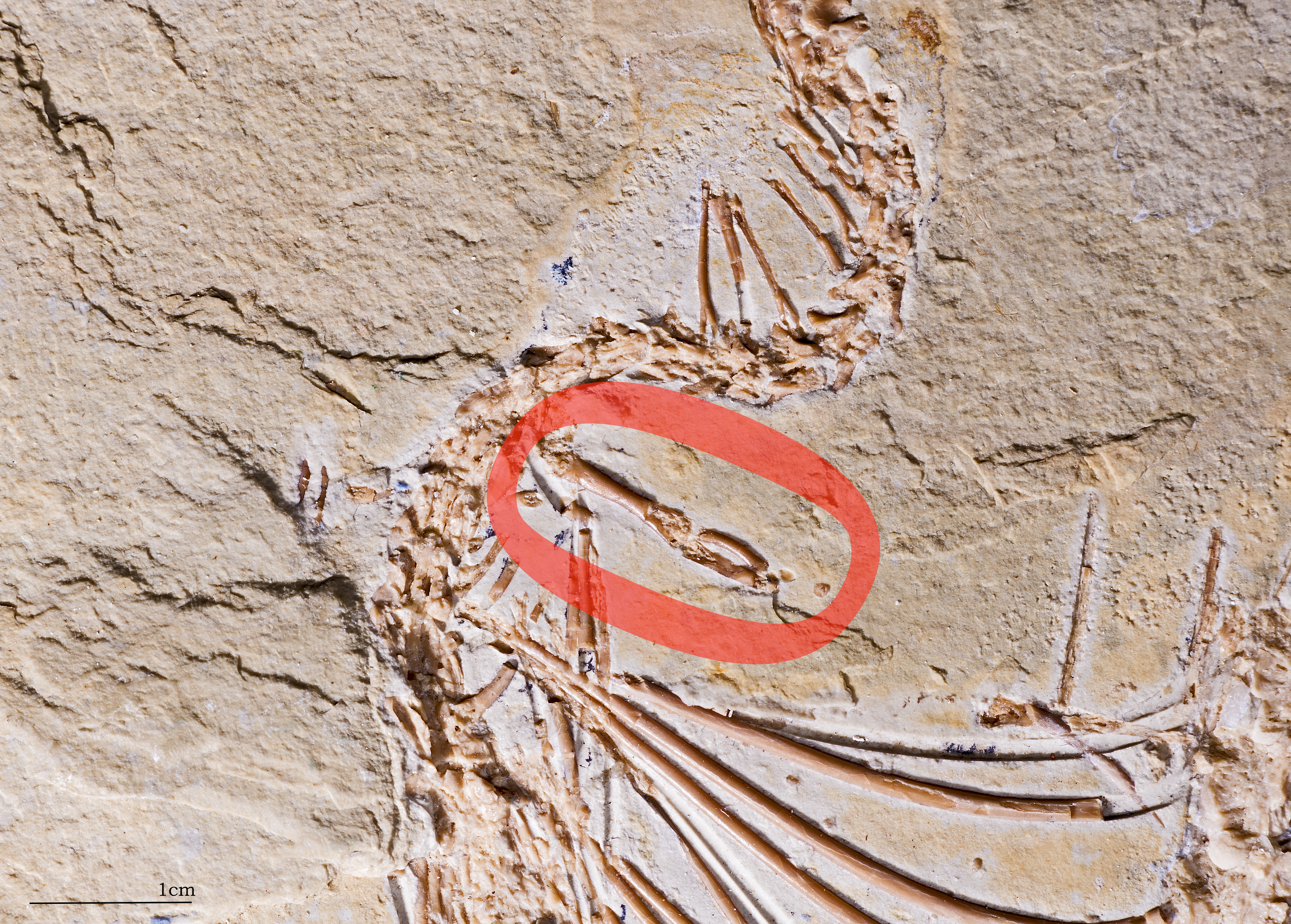
Eupodophis descouensi hind leg

=== Genetic basis of snake evolution ===
Both fossils and phylogenetic studies demonstrate that snakes evolved from lizards, hence the question became which genetic changes led to limb loss in the snake ancestor. Limb loss is actually very common in extant reptiles and has happened dozens of times within skinks, anguids, and other lizards.

In 2016, two studies reported that limb loss in snakes is associated with DNA mutations in the Zone of Polarizing Activity Regulatory Sequence (ZRS), a regulatory region of the sonic hedgehog gene which is critically required for limb development. More advanced snakes have no remnants of limbs, but basal snakes such as pythons and boas do have traces of highly reduced, vestigial hind limbs. Python embryos even have fully developed hind limb buds, but their later development is stopped by the DNA mutations in the ZRS.

== Distribution ==
Approximate world distribution of snakes

There are about 3,900 species of snakes, ranging as far northward as the Arctic Circle in Scandinavia and southward through Australia. Snakes can be found on every continent except Antarctica, as well as in the sea, and as high as 16,000 feet (4,900 m) in the Himalayan Mountains of Asia. There are numerous islands from which snakes are absent, such as Ireland, Iceland, and New Zealand (although New Zealand's northern waters are infrequently visited by the yellow-bellied sea snake and the banded sea krait).

== Biology ==
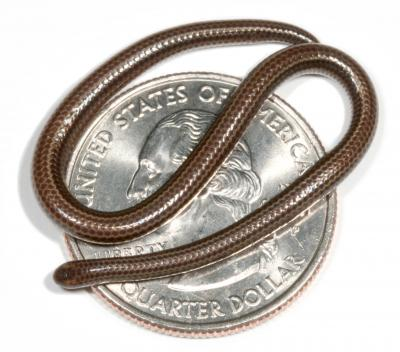
An adult Barbados threadsnake, Leptotyphlops carlae, on an American quarter dollar

=== Size ===
The extinct Titanoboa cerrejonensis was 12.8 m (42 ft) in length. By comparison, the largest extant snakes are the reticulated python, measuring about 6.95 m (22.8 ft) long, and the green anaconda, which measures about 5.21 m (17.1 ft) long and is considered the heaviest snake on Earth at 97.5 kg (215 lb).

At the other end of the scale, the smallest extant snake is Leptotyphlops carlae, with a length of about 10.4 cm (4.1 in). Most snakes are fairly small animals, approximately 1 m (3.3 ft) in length.

=== Perception ===
The sensory systems of snakes, particularly those of the Crotalidae family, commonly known as pit vipers, are among the most specialized in the animal kingdom. Pit vipers, which include rattlesnakes and related species, possess all the sensory organs found in other snakes, as well as additional adaptations. These include specialized infrared-sensitive receptors, known as pits, located on either side of the head between the nostrils and eyes. These pits, which resemble an additional pair of nostrils, are highly developed and allow pit vipers to detect minute temperature changes. Each pit consists of two cavities: a larger outer cavity positioned just behind and below the nostril, and a smaller inner cavity. These cavities are connected internally by a membrane containing nerves highly sensitive to thermal variations. The forward-facing pits create a combined field of detection, enabling pit vipers to distinguish objects from their surroundings and accurately judge distances. The sensitivity of these pits allows them to detect temperature differences as small as one-third of a degree Fahrenheit. Other infrared-sensitive snakes, such as those in the Boidae family, possess multiple smaller labial pits along the upper lip, just below the nostrils.

Snakes rely heavily on their sense of smell to track prey. They collect particles from the air, ground, or water using their forked tongue, which are then transferred to the vomeronasal organ (also known as Jacobson's organ) in the mouth for analysis. The forked structure of the tongue provides directional information of smell which helps locate prey or predators. In aquatic species, such as the anaconda, the tongue functions efficiently underwater. When the tongue is retracted, the forked tips are pressed into the cavities of the Jacobson's organ, enabling a combined taste-smell analysis that provides the snake with detailed information about its environment.

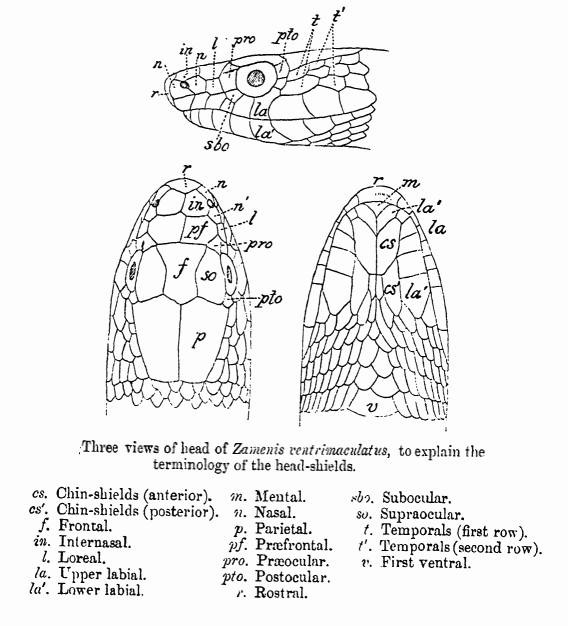
A line diagram from The Fauna of British India by G. A. Boulenger (1890), illustrating the terminology of shields on the head of a snake

Until the mid-20th century, it was widely believed that snakes were unable to hear. However, snakes possess two distinct auditory systems. One system, the somatic system, involves the transmission of vibrations through ventral skin receptors to the spine. The other system involves vibrations transmitted through the snake's elongated lung to the brain via cranial nerves. Snakes exhibit high sensitivity to vibrations, allowing them to detect even subtle sounds, such as soft speech, in quiet environments.

Snake vision varies significantly among species. While some snakes have keen eyesight, others can only distinguish light from dark. However, most snakes possess visual acuity sufficient to track movement. Arboreal snakes generally have better vision than burrowing species. Some snakes, such as the Asian vine snake, possess binocular vision, enabling both eyes to focus on the same point. Most snakes focus by moving the lens back and forth relative to the retina. Diurnal snakes typically have round pupils, while many nocturnal species have slit pupils. Most snakes possess three visual pigments, allowing them to perceive two primary colors in daylight. Certain species, such as the annulated sea snake and members of the genus Helicops, have regained significant color vision as an adaptation to their aquatic environments. Research suggests that the last common ancestor of all snakes had UV-sensitive vision. However, many diurnal snakes have evolved lenses that filter out UV light, likely improving contrast and sharpening their vision.

=== Skin ===
The skin of a snake is covered in scales. Contrary to the popular notion of snakes being slimy (because of possible confusion of snakes with worms), snakeskin has a smooth, dry texture. Most snakes use specialized belly scales to travel, allowing them to grip surfaces. The body scales may be smooth, keeled, or granular. The eyelids of a snake are transparent "spectacle" scales, also known as brille, which remain permanently closed.

For a snake, the skin has been modified to its specialized form of locomotion. Between the inner layer and the outer layer lies the dermis, which contains all the pigments and cells that make up the snake's distinguishing pattern and color. The epidermis, or outer layer, is formed of a substance called keratin, which in mammals is the same basic material that forms nails, claws, and hair. The snake's epidermis of keratin provides it with the armor it needs to protect its internal organs and reduce friction as it passes over rocks. Parts of this keratin armor are rougher than others. The less restricted portion overlaps the front of the scale beneath it. Between them lies a folded back connecting material, also of keratin, also part of the epidermis. This folded back material gives as the snake undulates or eats things bigger than the circumference of its body.

The shedding of scales is called ecdysis (or in normal usage, molting or sloughing). Snakes shed the complete outer layer of skin in one piece. Snake scales are not discrete, but extensions of the epidermis—hence they are not shed separately but as a complete outer layer during each molt, akin to a sock being turned inside out.

Snakes have a wide diversity of skin coloration patterns which are often related to behavior, such as the tendency to have to flee from predators. Snakes that are at a high risk of predation tend to be plain, or have longitudinal stripes, providing few reference points to predators, thus allowing the snake to escape without being noticed. Plain snakes usually adopt active hunting strategies, as their pattern allows them to send little information to prey about motion. Blotched snakes usually use ambush-based strategies, likely because it helps them blend into an environment with irregularly shaped objects, like sticks or rocks. Spotted patterning can similarly help snakes to blend into their environment.

The shape and number of scales on the head, back, and belly are often characteristic and used for taxonomic purposes. Scales are named mainly according to their positions on the body. In "advanced" (Caenophidian) snakes, the broad belly scales and rows of dorsal scales correspond to the vertebrae, allowing these to be counted without the need for dissection.

==== Molting ====
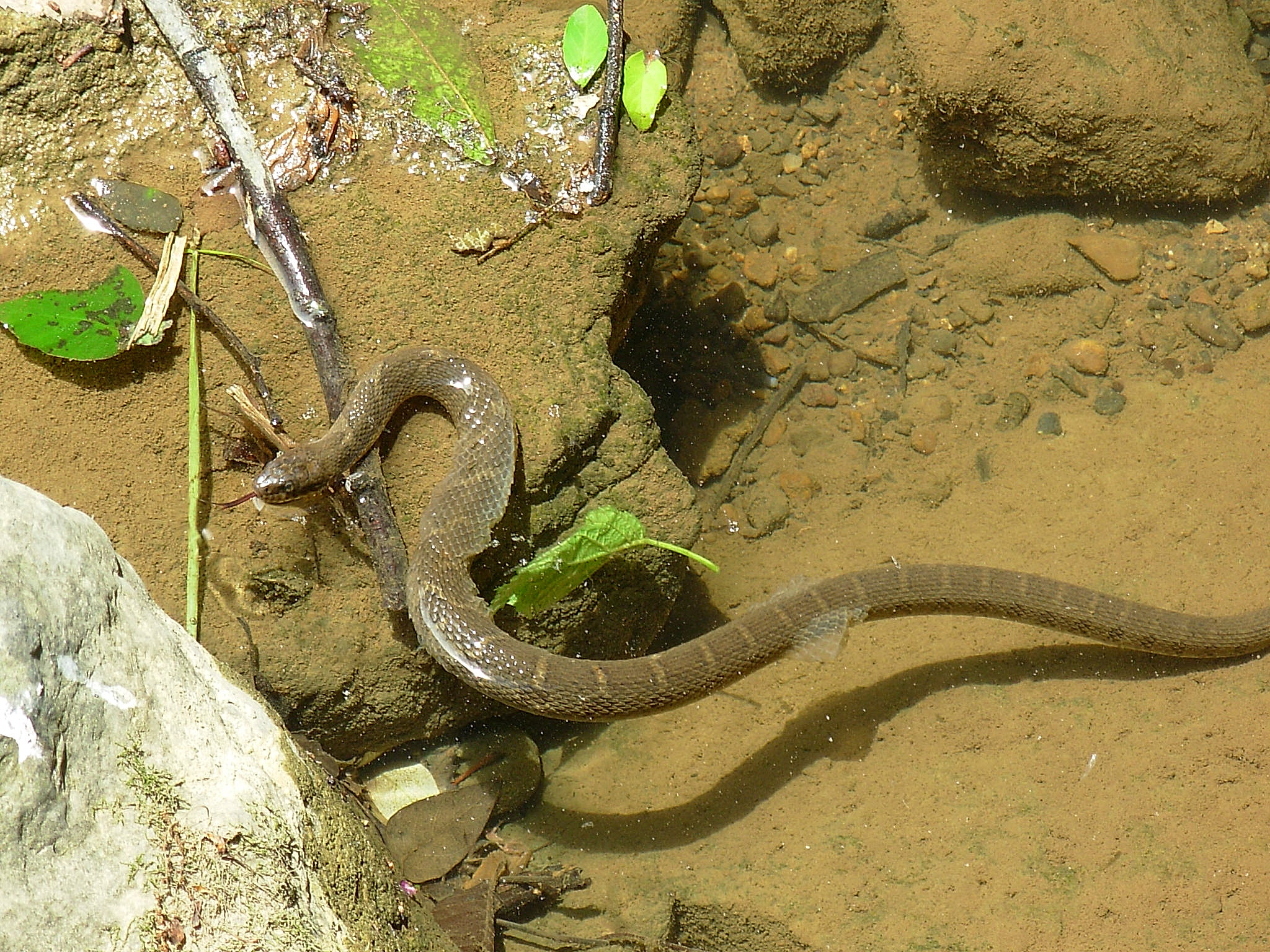
A common watersnake shedding its skin

Molting (or "ecdysis") serves a number of purposes - it allows old, worn skin to be replaced and can be synced to mating cycles, as with other animals. Molting occurs periodically throughout the life of a snake. Before each molt, the snake regulates its diet and seeks defensible shelter. Just before shedding, the skin becomes grey and the snake's eyes turn silvery. The inner surface of the old skin liquefies, causing it to separate from the new skin beneath it. After a few days, the eyes clear and the snake reaches out of its old skin, which splits. The snake rubs its body against rough surfaces to aid in the shedding of its old skin. In many cases, the castaway skin peels backward over the body from head to tail in one piece, like taking the dust jacket off a book, revealing a new, larger, brighter layer of skin which has formed underneath. Renewal of the skin by molting supposedly increases the mass of some animals such as insects, but in the case of snakes this has been disputed. Shedding skin can release pheromones and revitalize color and patterns of the skin to increase attraction of mates.

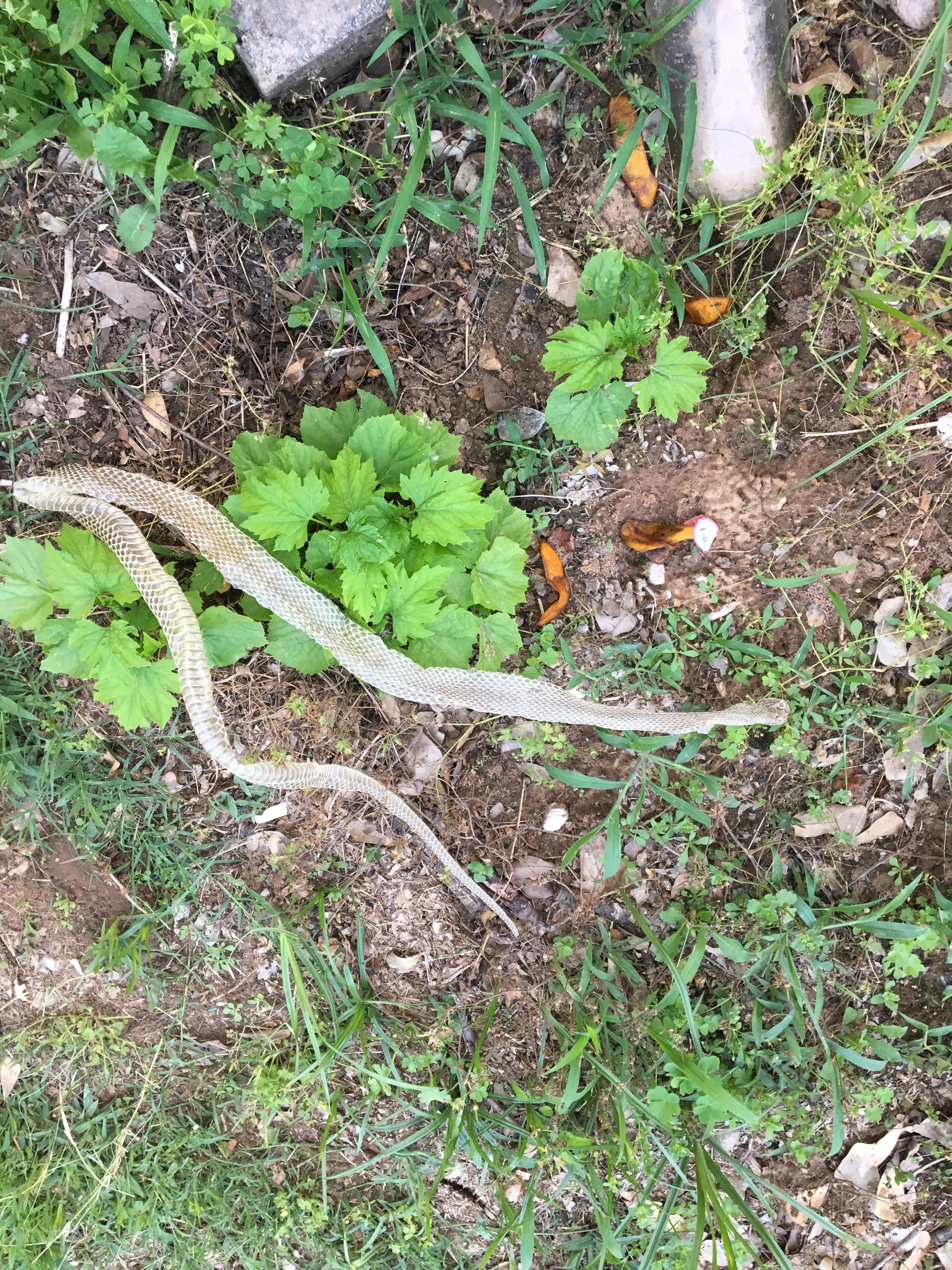
Shed skin of a snake

Snakes may shed four or five times a year, depending on the weather conditions, food supply, age of the snake, and other factors. It is theoretically possible to identify the snake from its cast skin if it is reasonably intact. Mythological associations of snakes with symbols of healing and medicine, as pictured in the Rod of Asclepius, are derivative of molting.

One can attempt to identify the sex of a snake when the species is not distinctly sexually dimorphic by counting scales. The cloaca is probed and measured against the subcaudal scales. Counting scales determines whether a snake is a male or female, as the hemipenis of a male being probed is usually longer.

=== Skeleton ===
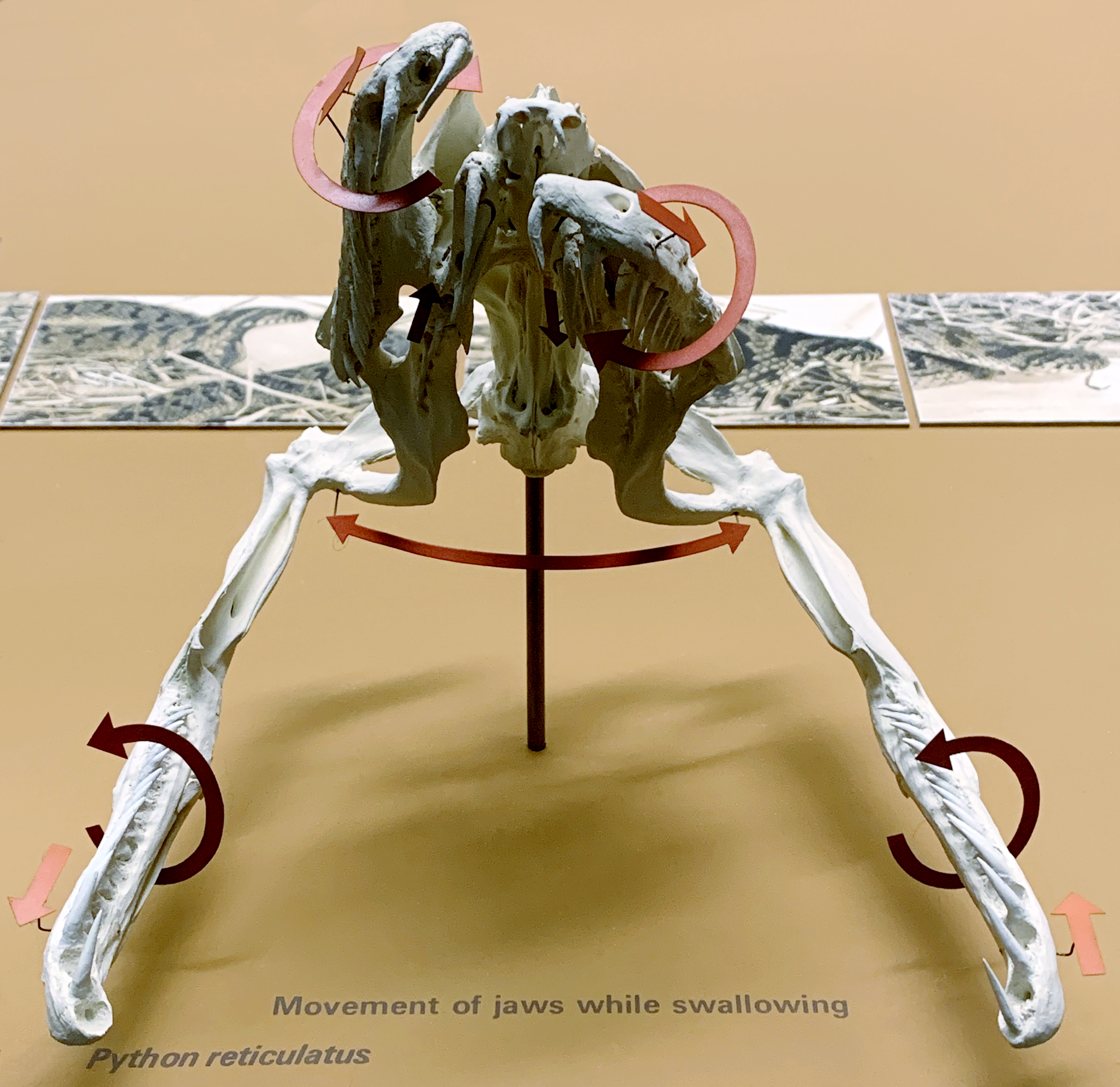
Reticulated python skull, showing jaw movements when swallowing

The skull of a snake differs from a lizard's in several ways. Snakes have more flexible jaws, that is, instead of a juncture at the upper and lower jaw, the snake's jaws are connected by a bone hinge that is called the quadrate bone. Between the two halves of the lower jaw at the chin there is an elastic ligament that allows for a separation. This allows the snake to swallow food larger in proportion to their size and go longer without it, since snakes ingest relatively more in one feeding. Because the sides of the lower jaw can move independently of one another, a snake resting its jaw on a surface has stereo auditory perception, used for detecting the position of prey. The jaw–quadrate–stapes pathway is capable of detecting vibrations on the angstrom scale, despite the absence of an outer ear and the lack of an impedance matching mechanism—provided by the ossicles in other vertebrates. In a snake's skull the brain is well protected. As brain tissues could be damaged through the palate, this protection is especially valuable. The solid and complete neurocranium of snakes is closed at the front.

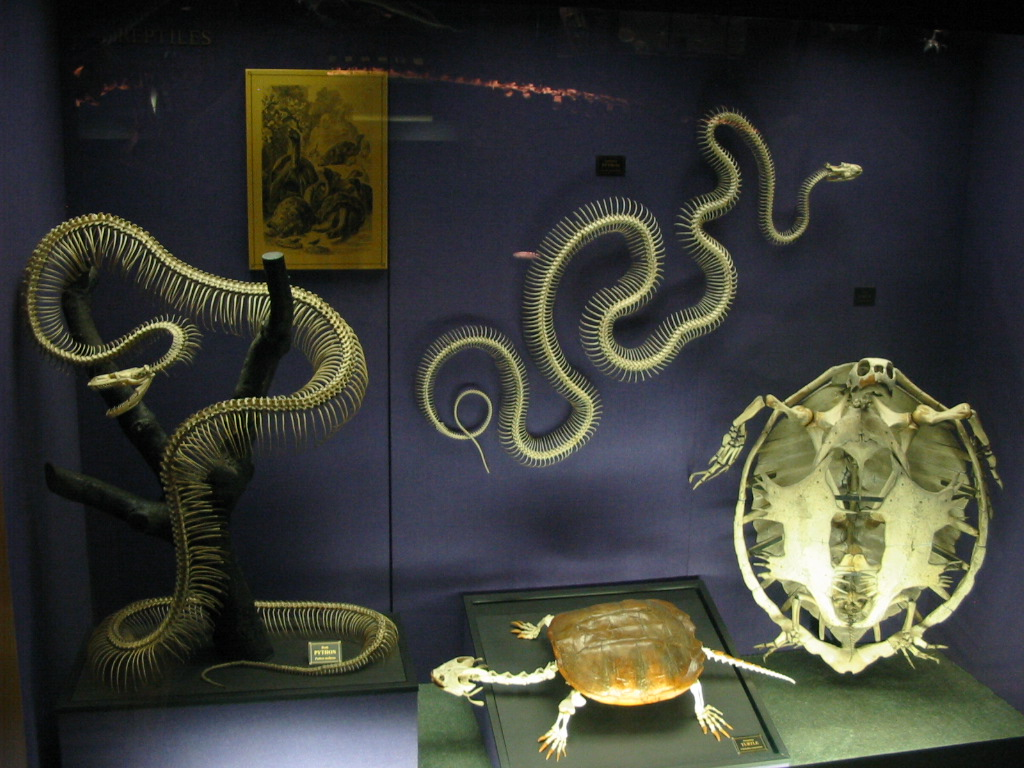
The skeletons of snakes are radically different from those of most other reptiles (as compared with the turtle here, for example), consisting almost entirely of an extended rib cage.

The skeleton of most snakes consists solely of the skull, hyoid, vertebral column, and ribs, though henophidian snakes retain vestiges of the pelvis and rear limbs. The hyoid is a small bone located posterior and ventral to the skull, in the 'neck' region, which serves as an attachment for the muscles of the snake's tongue, as it does in all other tetrapods. The vertebral column consists of between 200 and 400 vertebrae, or sometimes more. The body vertebrae each have two ribs articulating with them. The tail vertebrae are comparatively few in number (often less than 20% of the total) and lack ribs. The vertebrae have projections that allow for strong muscle attachment, enabling locomotion without limbs.

Caudal autotomy (self-amputation of the tail), a feature found in some lizards, is absent in most snakes. In the rare cases where it does exist in snakes, caudal autotomy is intervertebral (meaning the separation of adjacent vertebrae), unlike that in lizards, which is intravertebral, i.e. the break happens along a predefined fracture plane present on a vertebra.

In some snakes, most notably boas and pythons, there are vestiges of the hindlimbs in the form of a pair of pelvic spurs. These small, claw-like protrusions on each side of the cloaca are the external portion of the vestigial hindlimb skeleton, which includes the remains of an ilium and femur.

Snakes are polyphyodonts with teeth that are continuously replaced.

=== Internal organs ===
Anatomy of a snake:^{file info}: 1. esophagus; 2. trachea; 3. tracheal lungs; 4. rudimentary left lung; 5. right lung; 6. heart; 7. liver; 8. stomach; 9. air sac; 10. gallbladder; 11. pancreas; 12. spleen; 13. intestine; 14. testicles; 15. kidneys

Snakes and other non-archosaur (archosaurs being crocodilians, dinosaurs + birds and allies) reptiles have a three-chambered heart that controls the circulatory system via the left and right atrium, and one ventricle. Internally, the ventricle is divided into three interconnected cavities: the cavum arteriosum, the cavum pulmonale, and the cavum venosum. The cavum venosum receives deoxygenated blood from the right atrium and the cavum arteriosum receives oxygenated blood from the left atrium. Located beneath the cavum venosum is the cavum pulmonale, which pumps blood to the pulmonary trunk.

The snake's heart is encased in a sac, called the pericardium, located at the bifurcation of the bronchi. The heart is able to move around, owing to the lack of a diaphragm; this adjustment protects the heart from potential damage when large ingested prey is passed through the esophagus. The spleen is attached to the gall bladder and pancreas and filters the blood. The thymus, located in fatty tissue above the heart, is responsible for the generation of immune cells in the blood. The cardiovascular system of snakes is unique for the presence of a renal portal system in which the blood from the snake's tail passes through the kidneys before returning to the heart.

The circulatory system of a snake is basically like those of any other vertebrae. However, snakes do not regulate internally the temperature of their blood. Snakes are ectothermic (often referred to as cold-blooded) reptiles, meaning their body temperature is primarily regulated by the surrounding environment, although this varies by species and behavioral adaptations. Snakes can regulate blood temperature by moving. Too long in direct sunlight, the snakes' blood is heated beyond tolerance. Left in the ice or snow, the snake may freeze. In temperate zones with pronounced seasonal changes, snakes denning together have adapted to the onslaught of winter.

The vestigial left lung is often small or sometimes even absent, as snakes' tubular bodies require all of their organs to be long and thin. In the majority of species, only one lung is functional. This lung contains a vascularized anterior portion and a posterior portion that does not function in gas exchange. This 'saccular lung' is used for hydrostatic purposes to adjust buoyancy in some aquatic snakes and its function remains unknown in terrestrial species. Many organs that are paired, such as kidneys or reproductive organs, are staggered within the body, one located ahead of the other.

The snake with its particular arrangement of organs has the lung enclosed at the part nearest the head and throat an oxygen intake organ, while the other half is used for air reserve. The esophagus-stomach-intestine arrangement is a straight line. It ends where intestinal, urinary, and reproductive tracts open, in a chamber called the cloaca.

Snakes have no lymph nodes.

=== Venom ===
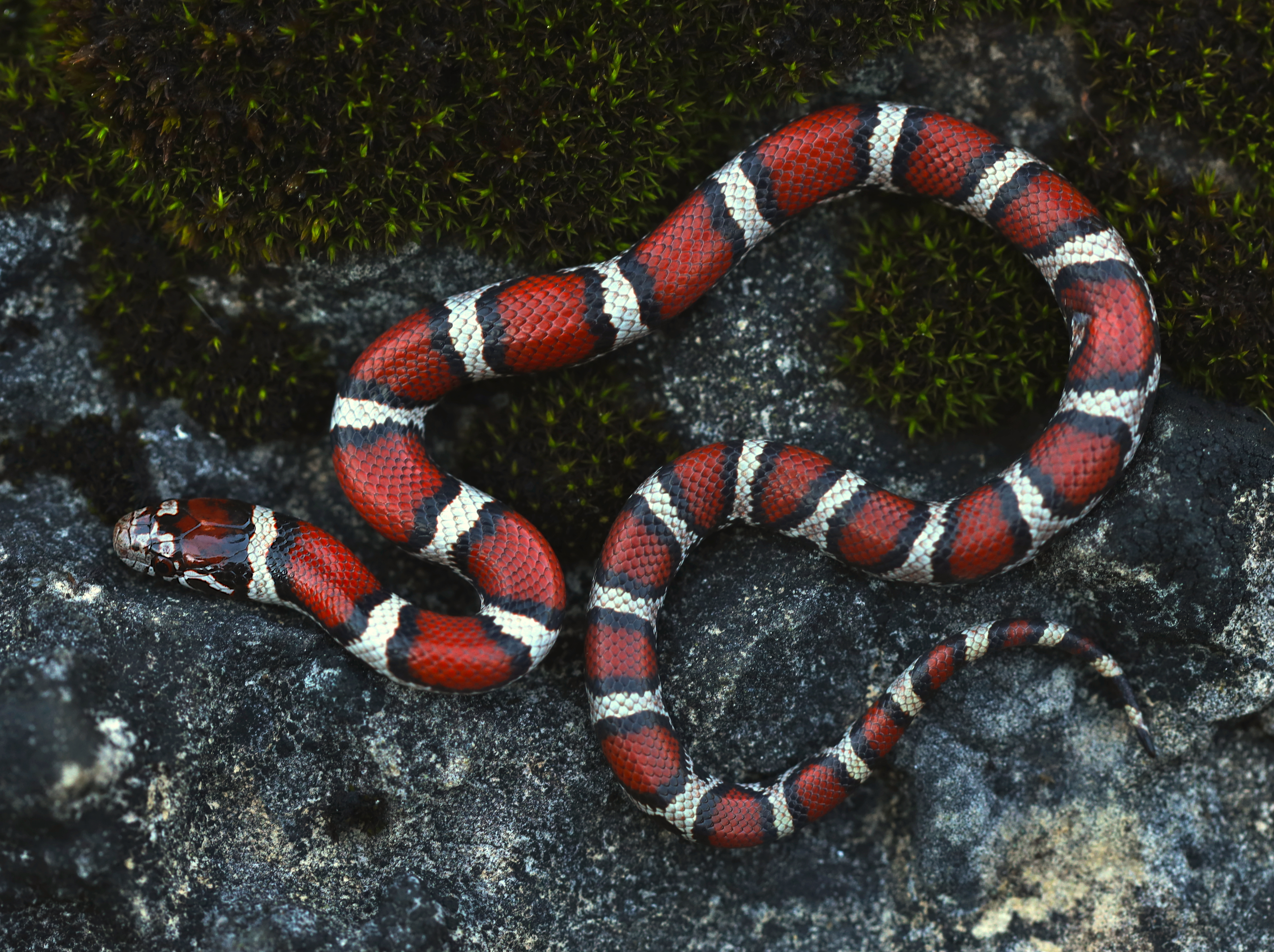
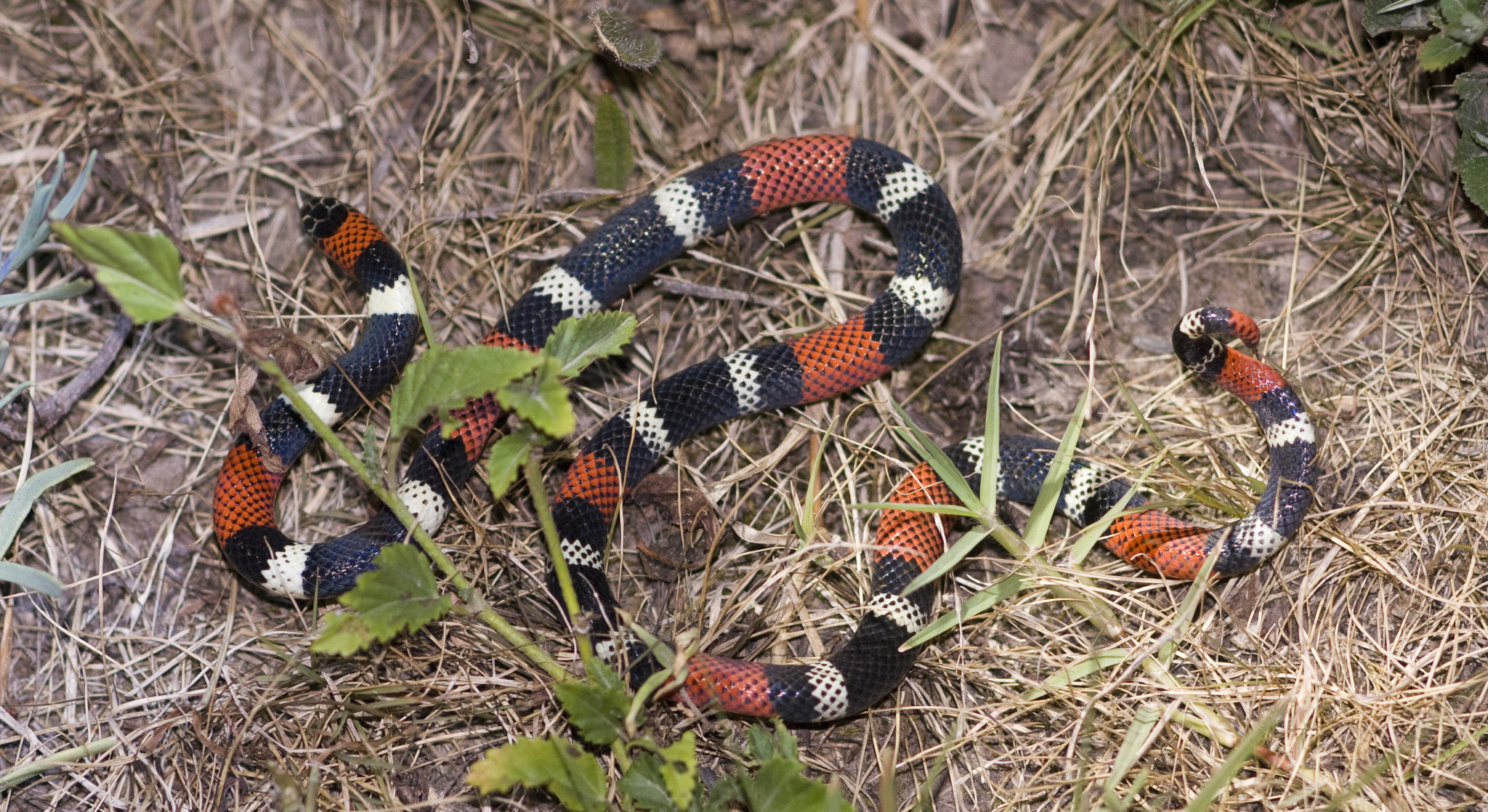
Innocuous milk snakes (top) are often mistaken for coral snakes (bottom) whose venom is deadly to humans.

Cobras, vipers, and closely related species use venom to immobilize, injure, or kill their prey. The venom is modified saliva, delivered through fangs. The fangs of 'advanced' venomous snakes like viperids and elapids are hollow, allowing venom to be injected more effectively, and the fangs of rear-fanged snakes such as the boomslang simply have a groove on the posterior edge to channel venom into the wound. Snake venom is often prey-specific, and their role in self-defense is secondary.

Venom, like all salivary secretions, is a pre-digestant that initiates the breakdown of food into soluble compounds, facilitating proper digestion. Even nonvenomous snakebites (like any animal bite) cause tissue damage.

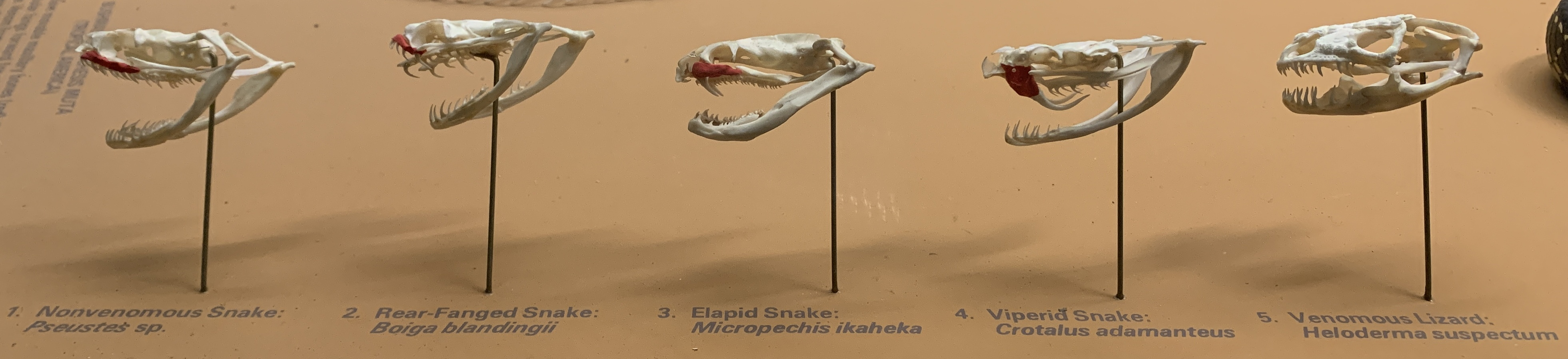
Skulls from left to right: Nonvenomous (Pseustes sp.), rear-fanged (Toxicodryas blandingii), elapid (Micropechis ikaheca), viperid (Crotalus adamanteus), venomous lizard (Heloderma suspectum). Maxilla in red.

Certain birds, mammals, and other snakes (such as kingsnakes) that prey on venomous snakes have developed resistance and even immunity to certain venoms. Venomous snakes include three families of snakes, and do not constitute a formal taxonomic classification group.

The colloquial term "poisonous snake" is generally an incorrect label for snakes. A poison is inhaled or ingested, whereas venom produced by snakes is injected into its victim via fangs. There are, however, two exceptions: Rhabdophis sequesters toxins from the toads it eats, then secretes them from nuchal glands to ward off predators; and a small unusual population of garter snakes in the US state of Oregon retains enough toxins in their livers from ingested newts to be effectively poisonous to small local predators (such as crows and foxes).

Snake venoms are complex mixtures of proteins, and are stored in venom glands at the back of the head. In all venomous snakes, these glands open through ducts into grooved or hollow teeth in the upper jaw. The proteins can potentially be a mix of neurotoxins (which attack the nervous system), hemotoxins (which attack the circulatory system), cytotoxins (which attack the cells directly), bungarotoxins (related to neurotoxins, but also directly affect muscle tissue), and many other toxins that affect the body in different ways. Almost all snake venom contains hyaluronidase, an enzyme that ensures rapid diffusion of the venom.

Venomous snakes that use hemotoxins usually have fangs in the front of their mouths, making it easier for them to inject the venom into their victims. Some snakes that use neurotoxins (such as the mangrove snake) have fangs in the back of their mouths, with the fangs curled backwards. This makes it difficult both for the snake to use its venom and for scientists to milk them. Elapids, however, such as cobras and kraits are proteroglyphous—they possess hollow fangs that cannot be erected toward the front of their mouths, and cannot "stab" like a viper. They must actually bite the victim.

It has been suggested that all snakes may be venomous to a certain degree, with harmless snakes having weak venom and no fangs. According to this theory, most snakes that are labelled "nonvenomous" would be considered harmless because they either lack a venom delivery method or are incapable of delivering enough to endanger a human. The theory postulates that snakes may have evolved from a common lizard ancestor that was venomous, and also that venomous lizards like the gila monster, beaded lizard, monitor lizards, and the now-extinct mosasaurs, may have derived from this same common ancestor. They share this "venom clade" with various other saurian species.

Venomous snakes are classified in two taxonomic families:

- Elapids – cobras including king cobras, kraits, mambas, Australian copperheads, sea snakes, and coral snakes.
- Viperids – vipers, rattlesnakes, copperheads/cottonmouths, and bushmasters.

There is a third family containing the opistoglyphous (rear-fanged) snakes (as well as the majority of other snake species):

- Colubrids – boomslangs, tree snakes, vine snakes, cat snakes, although not all colubrids are venomous.

=== Reproduction ===
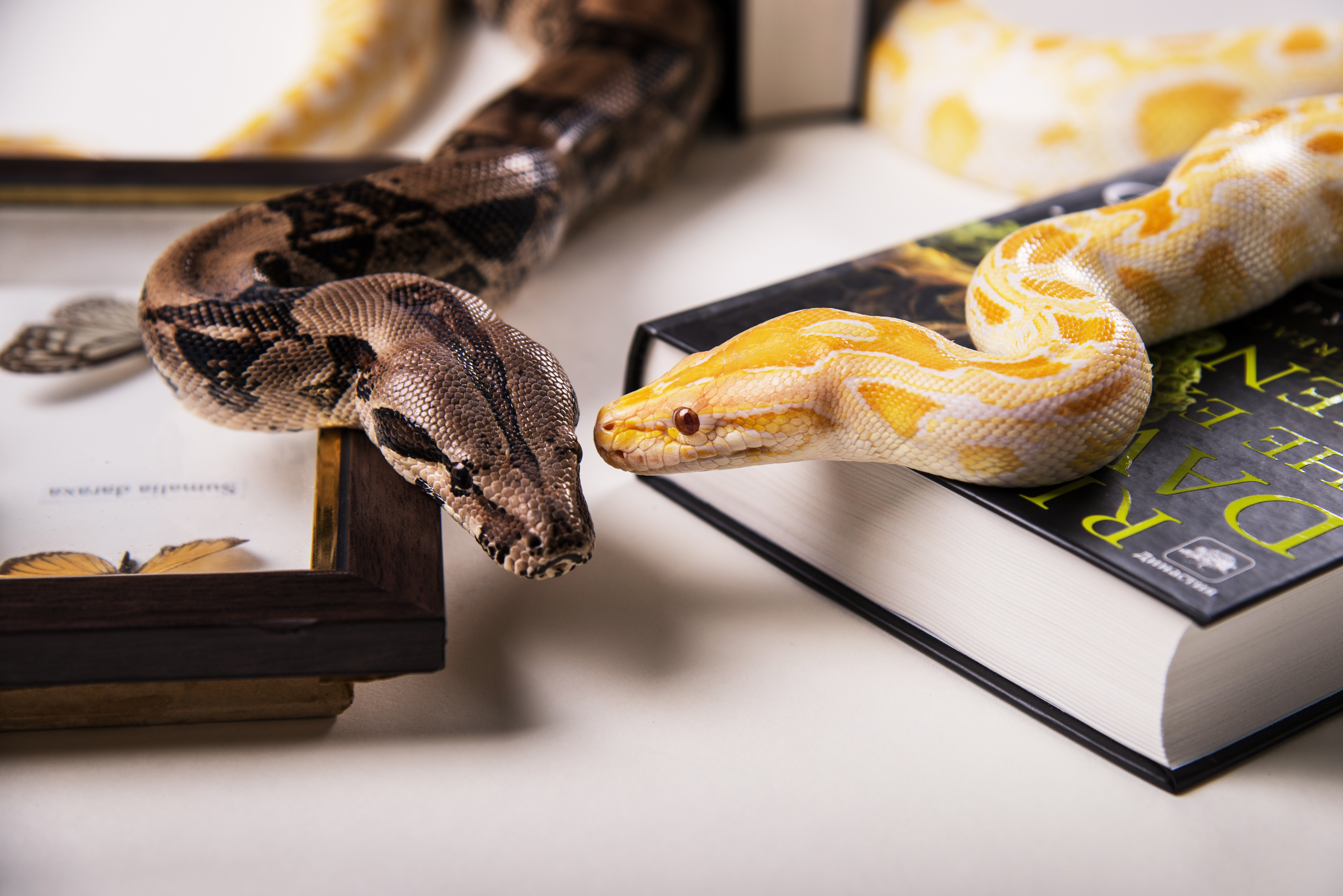
Boa imperator (left) and an albino Python molurus (right). The former gives birth to live young, while the latter lays eggs.

Although a wide range of reproductive modes are used by snakes, all employ internal fertilization. This is accomplished by means of paired, forked hemipenes, which are stored, inverted, in the male's tail. The hemipenes are often grooved, hooked, or spined—designed to grip the walls of the female's cloaca. The clitoris of the female snake consists of two structures located between the cloaca and the scent glands.

Most species of snakes lay eggs which they abandon shortly after laying. However, a few species (such as the king cobra) construct nests and stay in the vicinity of the hatchlings after incubation. Most pythons coil around their egg-clutches and remain with them until they hatch. A female python will not leave the eggs, except to occasionally bask in the sun or drink water. She will even "shiver" to generate heat to incubate the eggs.

Some species of snake are ovoviviparous and retain the eggs within their bodies until they are almost ready to hatch. Several species of snake, such as the boa constrictor and green anaconda, are fully viviparous, nourishing their young through a placenta as well as a yolk sac; this is highly unusual among reptiles, and normally found in requiem sharks or placental mammals. Retention of eggs and live birth are most often associated with colder environments.

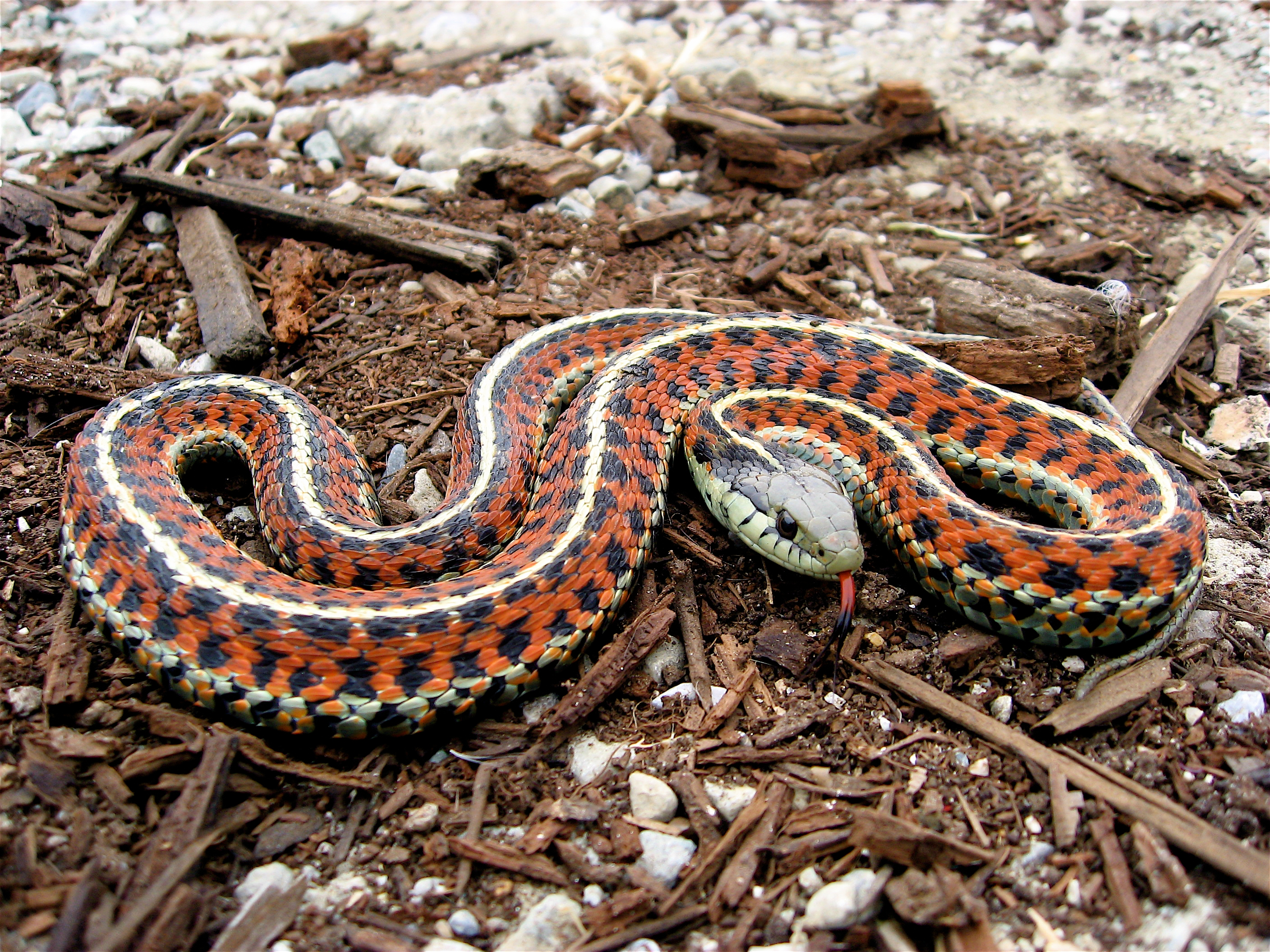
The garter snake has been studied for sexual selection.

Sexual selection in snakes is demonstrated by the 3,000 species that each use different tactics in acquiring mates. Ritual combat between males for the females they want to mate with includes topping, a behavior exhibited by most viperids in which one male will twist around the vertically elevated fore body of its opponent and force it downward. It is common for neck-biting to occur while the snakes are entwined.

=== Facultative parthenogenesis ===
Parthenogenesis is a natural form of reproduction in which growth and development of embryos occur without fertilization. Agkistrodon contortrix (copperhead) and Agkistrodon piscivorus (cottonmouth) can reproduce by facultative parthenogenesis, meaning that they are capable of switching from a sexual mode of reproduction to an asexual mode. The most likely type of parthenogenesis to occur is automixis with terminal fusion, a process in which two terminal products from the same meiosis fuse to form a diploid zygote. This process leads to genome-wide homozygosity, expression of deleterious recessive alleles, and often to developmental abnormalities. Both captive-born and wild-born copperheads and cottonmouths appear to be capable of this form of parthenogenesis.

Reproduction in squamate reptiles is almost exclusively sexual. Males ordinarily have a ZZ pair of sex-determining chromosomes, and females a ZW pair. However, the Colombian Rainbow boa (Epicrates maurus) can also reproduce by facultative parthenogenesis, resulting in production of WW female progeny. The WW females are likely produced by terminal automixis.

=== Embryonic development ===
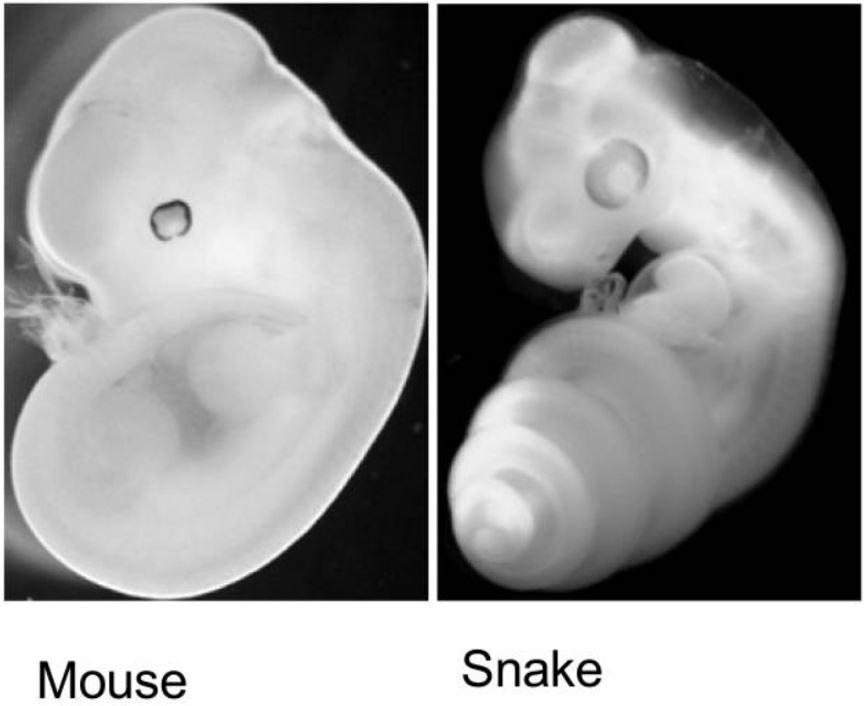
Mouse embryo 12 day post fertilization side by side with corn snake embryo 2 days post ovo-positioning

Snake embryonic development initially follows similar steps as any vertebrate embryo. The snake embryo begins as a zygote, undergoes rapid cell division, forms a germinal disc, also called a blastodisc, then undergoes gastrulation, neurulation, and organogenesis. Cell division and proliferation continues until an early snake embryo develops and the typical body shape of a snake can be observed. Multiple features differentiate the embryologic development of snakes from other vertebrates, two significant factors being the elongation of the body and the lack of limb development.

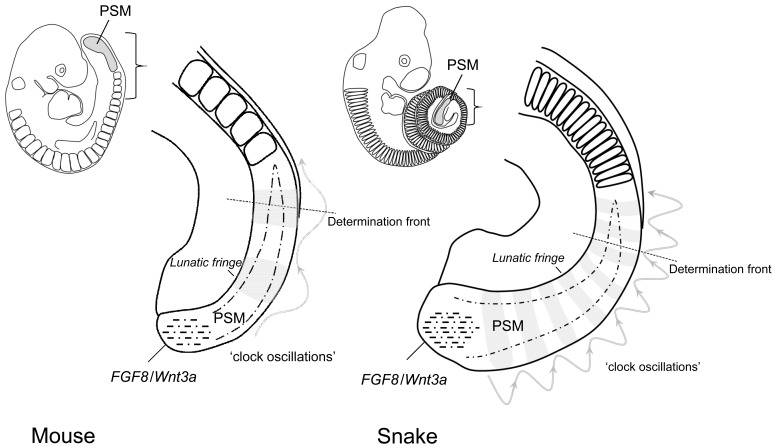
Diagram illustrating differential somite size due to difference in somitogenesis clock oscillation

The elongation in snake body is accompanied by a significant increase in vertebra count (mice have 60 vertebrae, whereas snakes may have over 300). This increase in vertebrae is due to an increase in somites during embryogenesis, leading to an increased number of vertebrae which develop. Somites are formed at the presomitic mesoderm due to a set of oscillatory genes that direct the somitogenesis clock. The snake somitogenesis clock operates at a frequency 4 times that of a mouse (after correction for developmental time), creating more somites, and therefore creating more vertebrae. This difference in clock speed is believed to be caused by differences in Lunatic fringe gene expression, a gene involved in the somitogenesis clock.

There is ample literature focusing on the limb development/lack of development in snake embryos and the gene expression associated with the different stages. In basal snakes, such as the python, embryos in early development exhibit a hind limb bud that develops with some cartilage and a cartilaginous pelvic element, however this degenerates before hatching. This presence of vestigial development suggests that some snakes are still undergoing hind limb reduction before they are eliminated. There is no evidence in basal snakes of forelimb rudiments and no examples of snake forelimb bud initiation in embryo, so little is known regarding the loss of this trait. Recent studies suggest that hind limb reduction could be due to mutations in enhancers for the SSH gene, however other studies suggested that mutations within the Hox Genes or their enhancers could contribute to snake limblessness. Since multiple studies have found evidence suggesting different genes played a role in the loss of limbs in snakes, it is likely that multiple gene mutations had an additive effect leading to limb loss in snakes.

== Behavior and life history ==
=== Winter dormancy ===
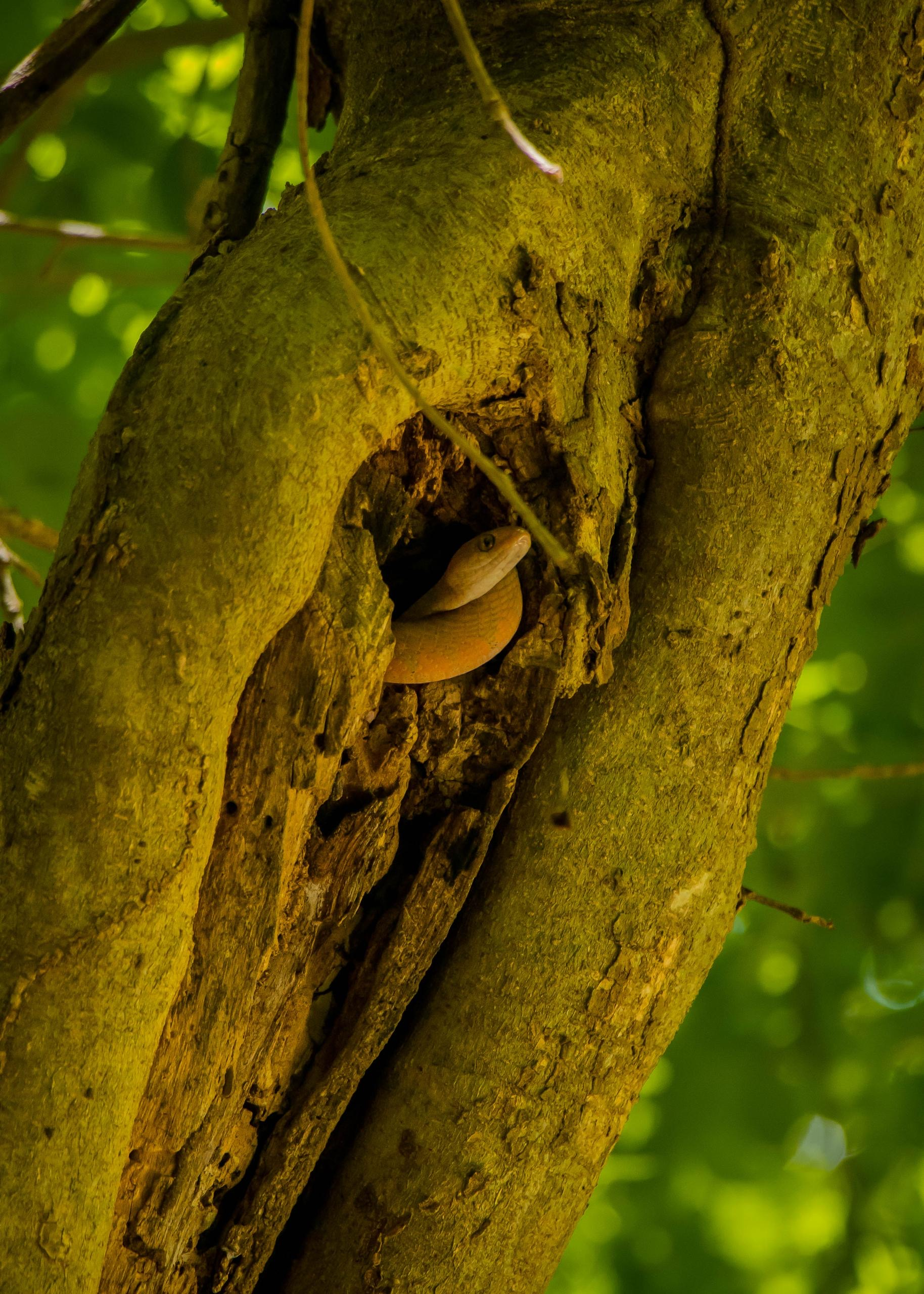
A snaked coiled in the cavity of a tree

In regions where winters are too cold for snakes to tolerate while remaining active, local species will enter a period of brumation. Unlike hibernation, in which the dormant mammals are actually asleep, brumating reptiles are awake but inactive. Individual snakes may brumate in burrows, under rock piles, or inside fallen trees, or large numbers of snakes may clump together in hibernacula.

=== Feeding and diet ===
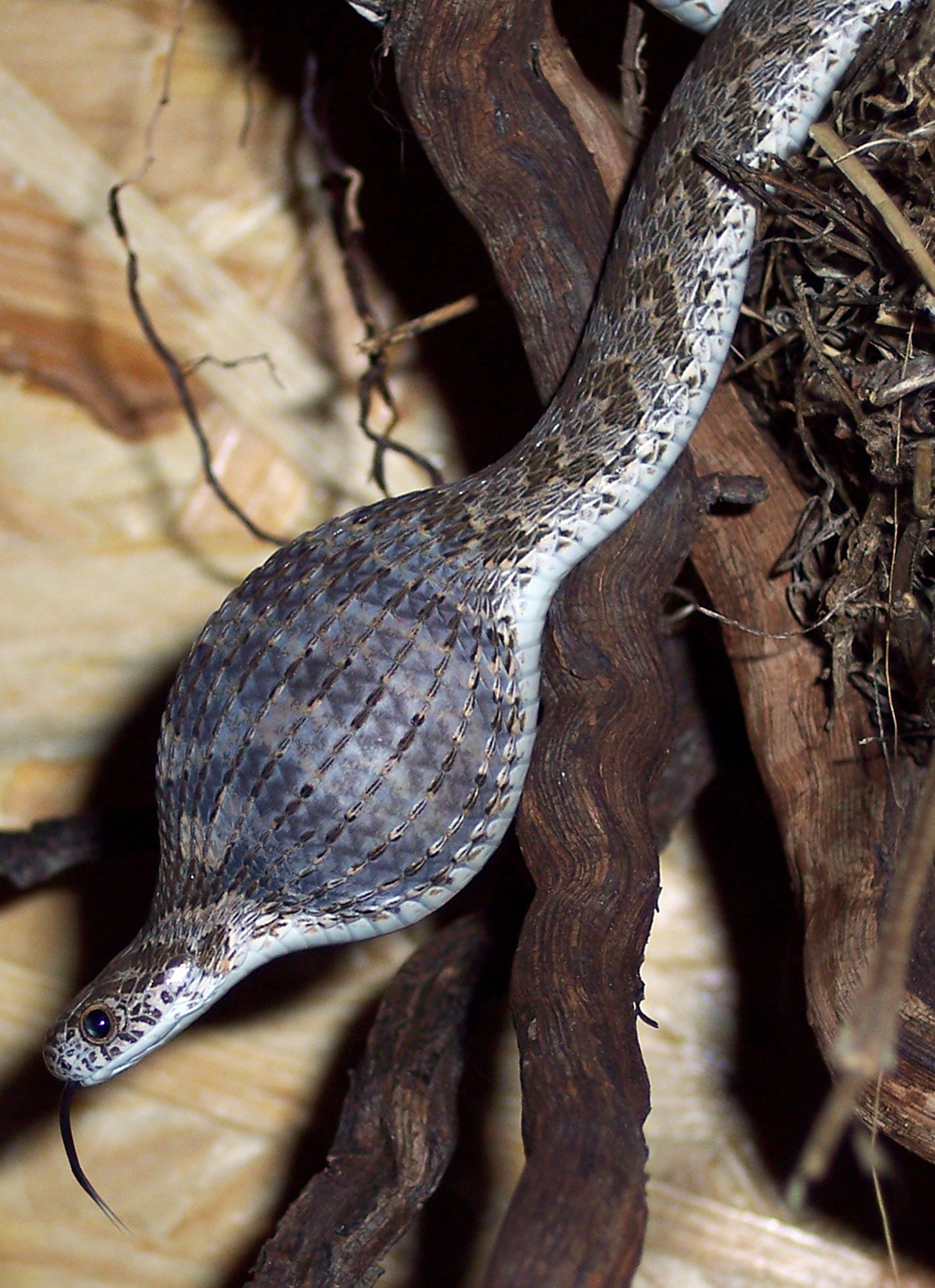
African egg-eating snake eating an egg

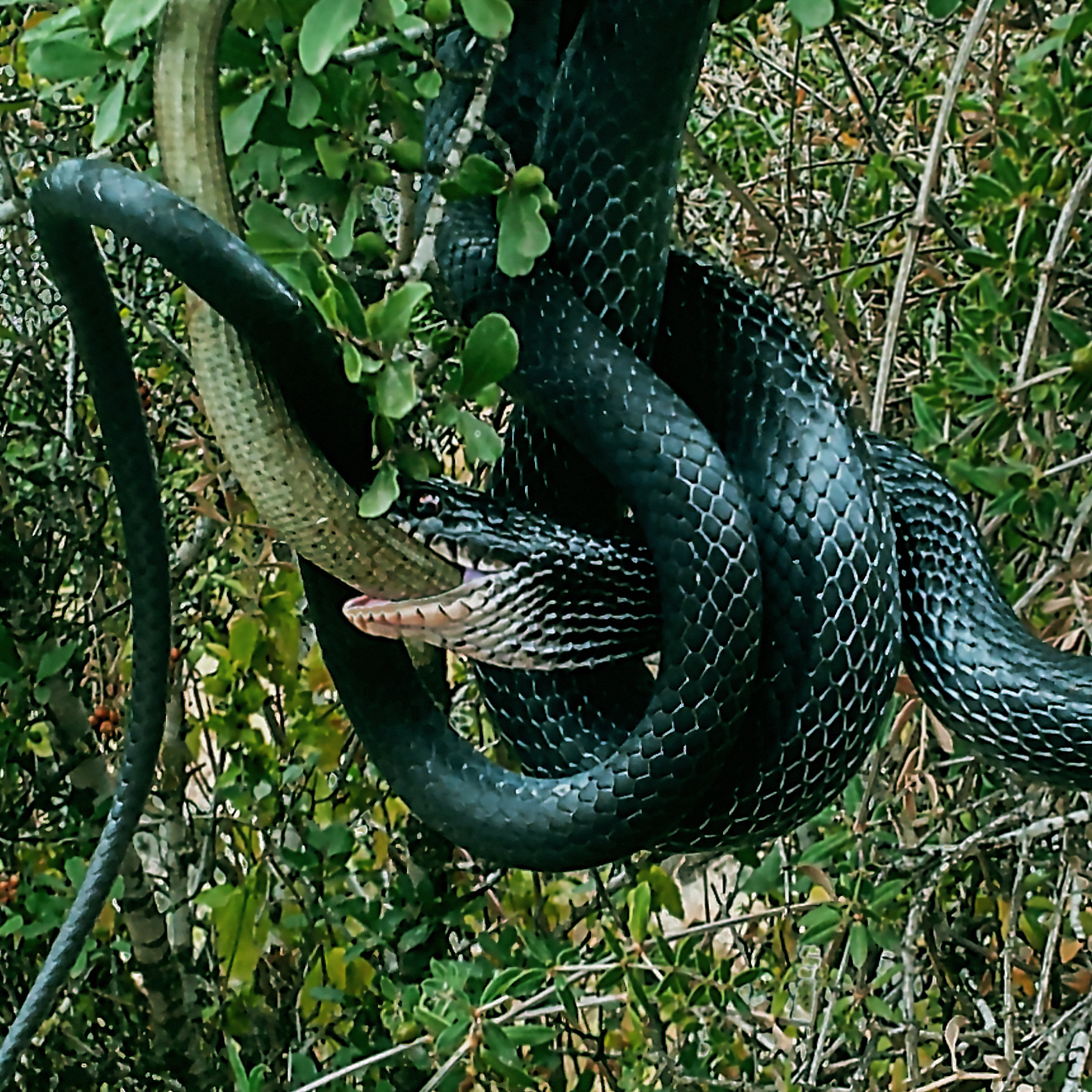
Dolichophis jugularis preying on a sheltopusik

All snakes are strictly carnivorous, preying on small animals including lizards, frogs, other snakes, small mammals, birds, eggs, fish, snails, worms, and insects. Because snakes are primary ambush predators, they often have to wait for a long time between each prey. As an adaptation to these prolonged periods of fasting, they have lost the "hunger hormone" known as ghrelin. Snakes cannot bite or tear their food to pieces so must swallow their prey whole. The eating habits of a snake are largely influenced by body size; smaller snakes eat smaller prey. Juvenile pythons might start out feeding on lizards or mice and graduate to small deer or antelope as an adult, for example.

The snake's jaw is a complex structure. Contrary to the popular belief that snakes can dislocate their jaws, they have an extremely flexible lower jaw, the two halves of which are not rigidly attached, and numerous other joints in the skull, which allow the snake to open its mouth wide enough to swallow prey whole, even if it is larger in diameter than the snake itself. For example, the African egg-eating snake has flexible jaws adapted for eating eggs much larger than the diameter of its head. This snake has no teeth, but does have bony protrusions on the inside edge of its spine, which it uses to break the shell when eating eggs.

The majority of snakes eat a variety of prey animals, but there is some specialization in certain species. King cobras and the Australian bandy-bandy consume other snakes. Species of the family Pareidae have more teeth on the right side of their mouths than on the left, as they mostly prey on snails and the shells usually spiral clockwise.

Some snakes have a venomous bite, which they use to kill their prey before eating it. Other snakes kill their prey by constriction, while some swallow their prey when it is still alive.

After eating, snakes become dormant to allow the process of digestion to take place; this is an intense activity, especially after consumption of large prey. In species that feed only sporadically, the entire intestine enters a reduced state between meals to conserve energy. The digestive system is then 'up-regulated' to full capacity within 48 hours of prey consumption. Being ectothermic ("cold-blooded"), the surrounding temperature plays an important role in the digestion process. The ideal temperature for snakes to digest food is 30 °C (86 °F). There is a huge amount of metabolic energy involved in a snake's digestion, for example the surface body temperature of the South American rattlesnake (Crotalus durissus) increases by as much as 1.2 °C (2.2 °F) during the digestive process. If a snake is disturbed after having eaten recently, it will often regurgitate its prey to be able to escape the perceived threat. When undisturbed, the digestive process is highly efficient; the snake's digestive enzymes dissolve and absorb everything but the prey's hair (or feathers) and claws, which are excreted along with waste.

=== Hooding and spitting ===
Hooding (expansion of the neck area) is a visual deterrent, mostly seen in cobras (elapids), and is primarily controlled by rib muscles. Hooding can be accompanied by spitting venom towards the threatening object, and producing a specialized sound, hissing. Studies on captive cobras showed that 13–22% of the body length is raised during hooding.

=== Locomotion ===
The lack of limbs does not impede the movement of snakes. They have developed several different modes of locomotion to deal with particular environments. Unlike the gaits of limbed animals, which form a continuum, each mode of snake locomotion is discrete and distinct from the others; transitions between modes are abrupt.

==== Lateral undulation ====
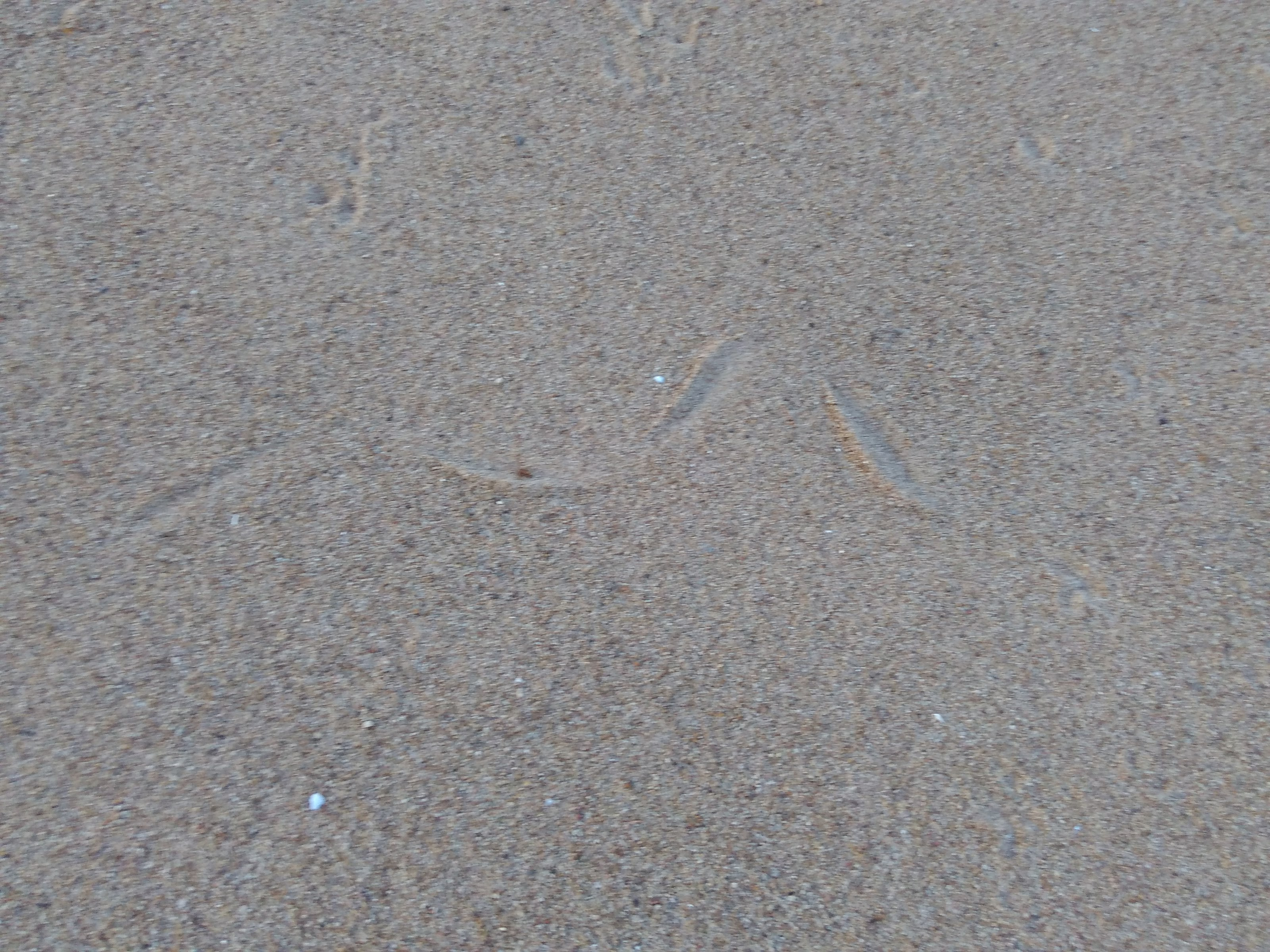
Crawling prints of a snake

Lateral undulation is the sole mode of aquatic locomotion, and the most common mode of terrestrial locomotion. In this mode, the body of the snake alternately flexes to the left and right, resulting in a series of rearward-moving "waves". While this movement appears rapid, snakes have rarely been documented moving faster than two body-lengths per second, often much less. This mode of movement has the same net cost of transport (calories burned per meter moved) as running in lizards of the same mass.

Terrestrial lateral undulation is the most common mode of terrestrial locomotion for most snake species. In this mode, the posteriorly moving waves push against contact points in the environment, such as rocks, twigs, irregularities in the soil, etc. Each of these environmental objects, in turn, generates a reaction force directed forward and towards the midline of the snake, resulting in forward thrust while the lateral components cancel out. The speed of this movement depends upon the density of push-points in the environment, with a medium density of about 8 along the snake's length being ideal. The wave speed is precisely the same as the snake speed, and as a result, every point on the snake's body follows the path of the point ahead of it, allowing snakes to move through very dense vegetation and small openings.

When swimming, the waves become larger as they move down the snake's body, and the wave travels backwards faster than the snake moves forwards. Thrust is generated by pushing their body against the water, resulting in the observed slip. In spite of overall similarities, studies show that the pattern of muscle activation is different in aquatic versus terrestrial lateral undulation, which justifies calling them separate modes. All snakes can laterally undulate forward (with backward-moving waves), but only sea snakes have been observed reversing the motion (moving backwards with forward-moving waves).

==== Sidewinding ====
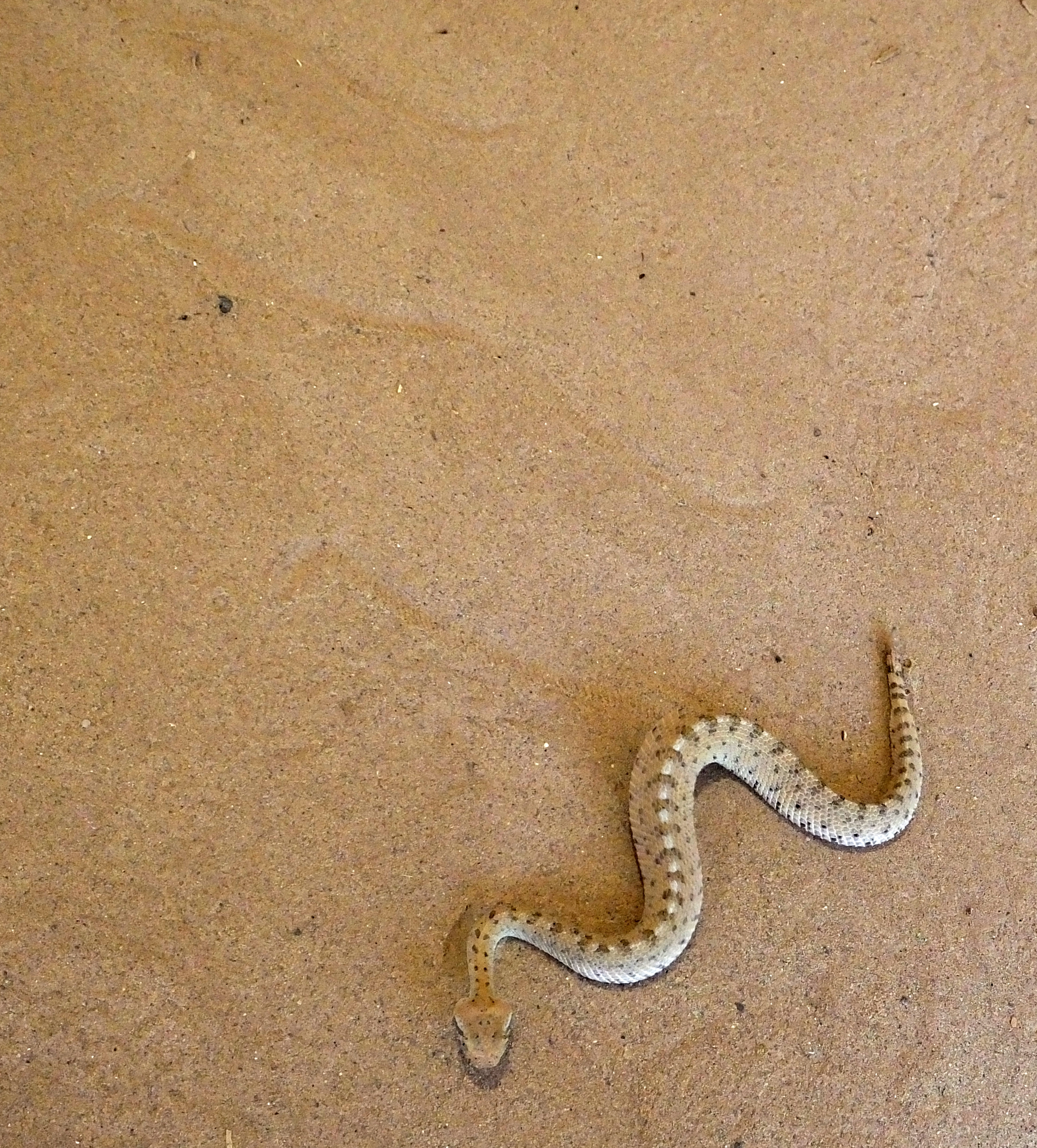
A neonate sidewinder rattlesnake (Crotalus cerastes) sidewinding

Most often employed by colubroid snakes (colubrids, elapids, and vipers) when the snake must move in an environment that lacks irregularities to push against (rendering lateral undulation impossible), such as a slick mud flat, or a sand dune, sidewinding is a modified form of lateral undulation in which all of the body segments oriented in one direction remain in contact with the ground, while the other segments are lifted up, resulting in a peculiar "rolling" motion. The sidewinder moves forward by throwing a loop of itself and then pulling itself up by it. By lowering its head the snake gets leverage, straightening itself out and pressing itself against the ground, it brings itself forward and at an angle that leaves it ready for the next jump. The head and the loop are in effect the two feet upon which the snake walks. The snake's body, appearing roughly perpendicular to its direction, may bewilder the observer, since preconception may lead one to associate snake movement with a head that leads and a body that follows. It appears the sidewinder is going sideways - but precisely where the snake is going, where it wants to go, the head gives clear indication. The snake leaves behind a trail that looks like a series of hooks one after the next. Snakes can move backwards to retreat from an enemy, though they normally do not. This mode of locomotion overcomes the slippery nature of sand or mud by pushing off with only static portions on the body, thereby minimizing slipping. The static nature of the contact points can be shown from the tracks of a sidewinding snake, which show each belly scale imprint, without any smearing. This mode of locomotion has very low caloric cost, less than 1/3 of the cost for a lizard to move the same distance. Contrary to popular belief, there is no evidence that sidewinding is associated with the sand being hot.

==== Concertina ====
When push-points are absent, but there is not enough space to use sidewinding because of lateral constraints, such as in tunnels, snakes rely on concertina locomotion. In this mode, the snake braces the posterior portion of its body against the tunnel wall while the front of the snake extends and straightens. The front portion then flexes and forms an anchor point, and the posterior is straightened and pulled forwards. This mode of locomotion is slow and very demanding, up to seven times the cost of laterally undulating over the same distance. This high cost is due to the repeated stops and starts of portions of the body as well as the necessity of using active muscular effort to brace against the tunnel walls.

==== Arboreal ====
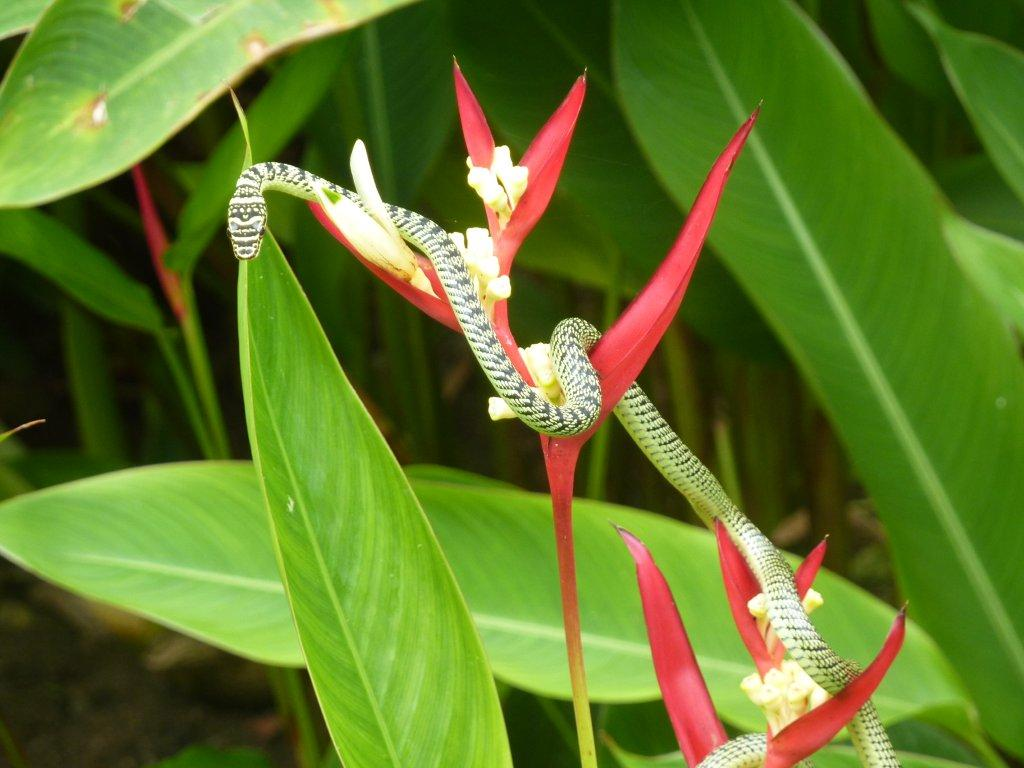
Golden tree snake climbing a flower

The movement of snakes in arboreal habitats has only recently been studied. While on tree branches, snakes use several modes of locomotion depending on species and bark texture. In general, snakes will use a modified form of concertina locomotion on smooth branches, but will laterally undulate if contact points are available. Snakes move faster on small branches and when contact points are present, in contrast to limbed animals, which do better on large branches with little 'clutter'.

Gliding snakes (Chrysopelea) of Southeast Asia launch themselves from branch tips, spreading their ribs and laterally undulating as they glide between trees. These snakes can perform a controlled glide for hundreds of feet depending upon launch altitude and can even turn in midair.

==== Rectilinear ====
The slowest mode of snake locomotion is rectilinear locomotion, which is also the only one where the snake does not need to bend its body laterally, though it may do so when turning. In this mode, the belly scales are lifted and pulled forward before being placed down and the body pulled over them. Waves of movement and stasis pass posteriorly, resulting in a series of ripples in the skin. The ribs of the snake do not move in this mode of locomotion and this method is most often used by large pythons, boas, and vipers when stalking prey across open ground as the snake's movements are subtle and harder to detect by their prey in this manner.

== Interactions with humans ==
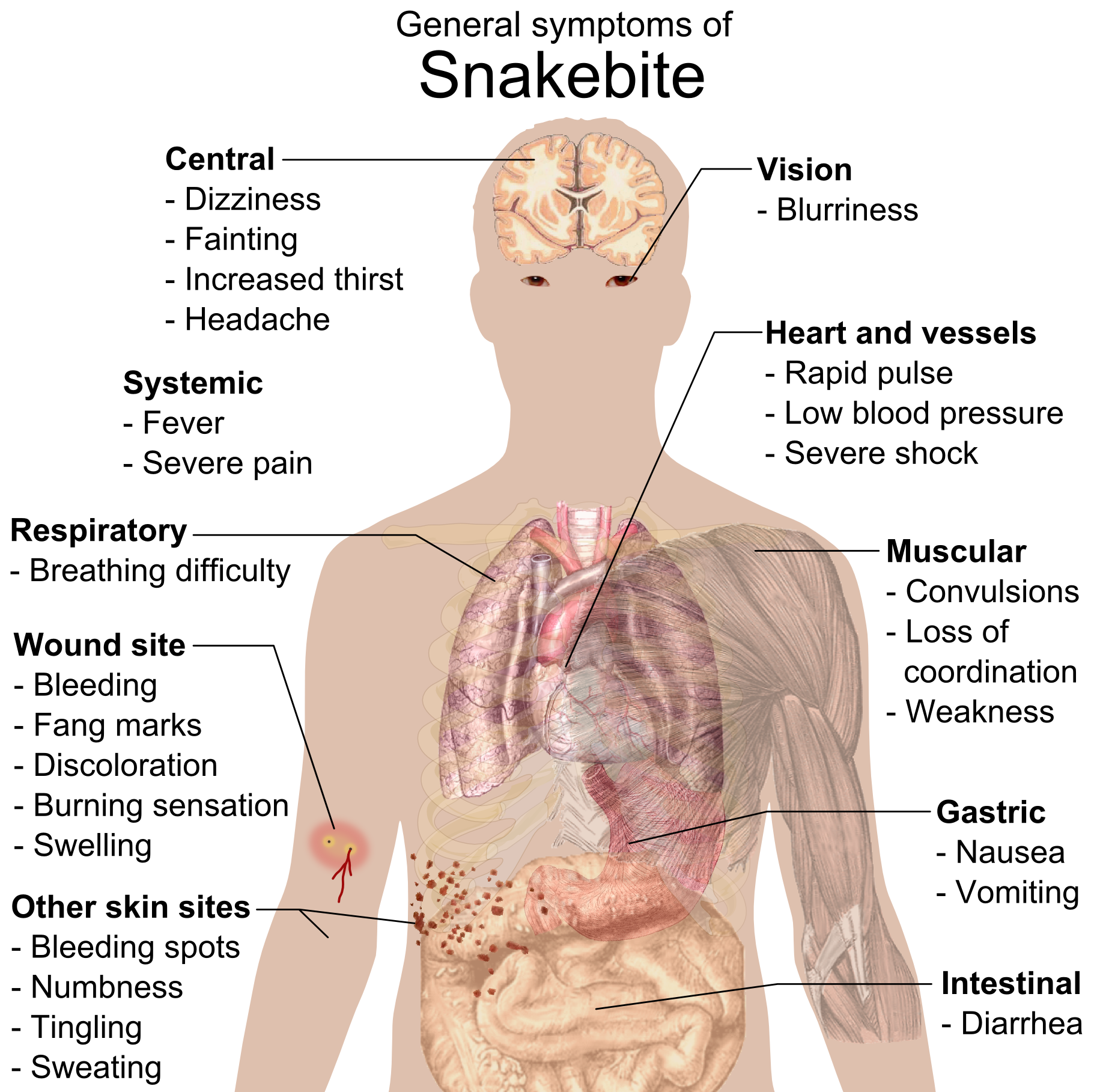
Most common symptoms of any kind of snake bite envenomation. Furthermore, there is vast variation in symptoms between bites from different types of snakes.

=== Bite ===
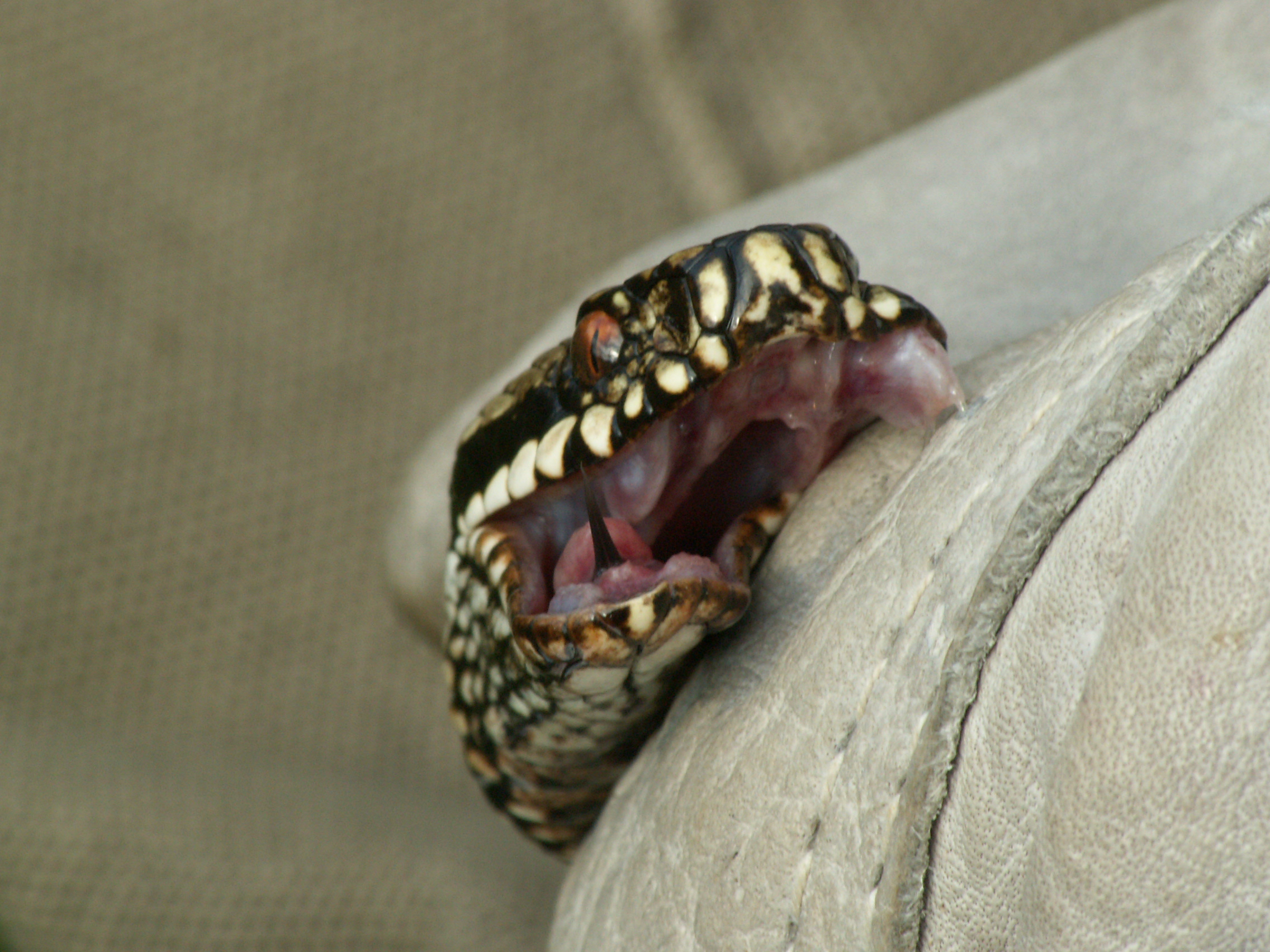
Vipera berus, one fang in glove with a small venom stain, the other still in place

Snakes do not ordinarily prey on humans. Unless startled or injured, most snakes prefer to avoid contact and will not attack humans. With the exception of large constrictors, nonvenomous snakes are not a threat to humans. The bite of a nonvenomous snake is usually harmless; their teeth are not adapted for tearing or inflicting a deep puncture wound, but rather grabbing and holding. Although the possibility of infection and tissue damage is present in the bite of a nonvenomous snake, venomous snakes present far greater hazard to humans. The World Health Organization (WHO) lists snakebite under the "other neglected conditions" category.

Documented deaths resulting from snake bites are uncommon. Nonfatal bites from venomous snakes may result in the need for amputation of a limb or part thereof. Of the roughly 725 species of venomous snakes worldwide, only 250 are able to kill a human with one bite. Australia averages only one fatal snake bite per year. In India, 250,000 snakebites are recorded in a single year, with as many as 50,000 recorded initial deaths. The WHO estimates that on the order of 100,000 people die each year as a result of snake bites, and around three times as many amputations and other permanent disabilities are caused by snakebites annually.

The health of people is seriously threatened by snakebites, especially in areas where there is a great diversity of snakes and little access to medical care such as the Amazon Rainforest region in South America. Snakebite is classified by the World Health Organization (WHO) as "other neglected conditions". Although there aren't many recorded snakebite deaths, the bites can cause serious complications and permanent impairments. The most successful treatment for snakebites is still antivenom, which is made from snake venom. However, access to antivenom differs greatly by location, with rural areas frequently experiencing difficulties with both cost and availability. Clinical studies, serum preparation, and venom extraction are among the intricate procedures involved in the manufacturing of antivenom. The development of alternative treatments and increased accessibility and affordability of antivenom are essential for reducing the global impact of snake bites on human populations.

=== Snake charmers ===
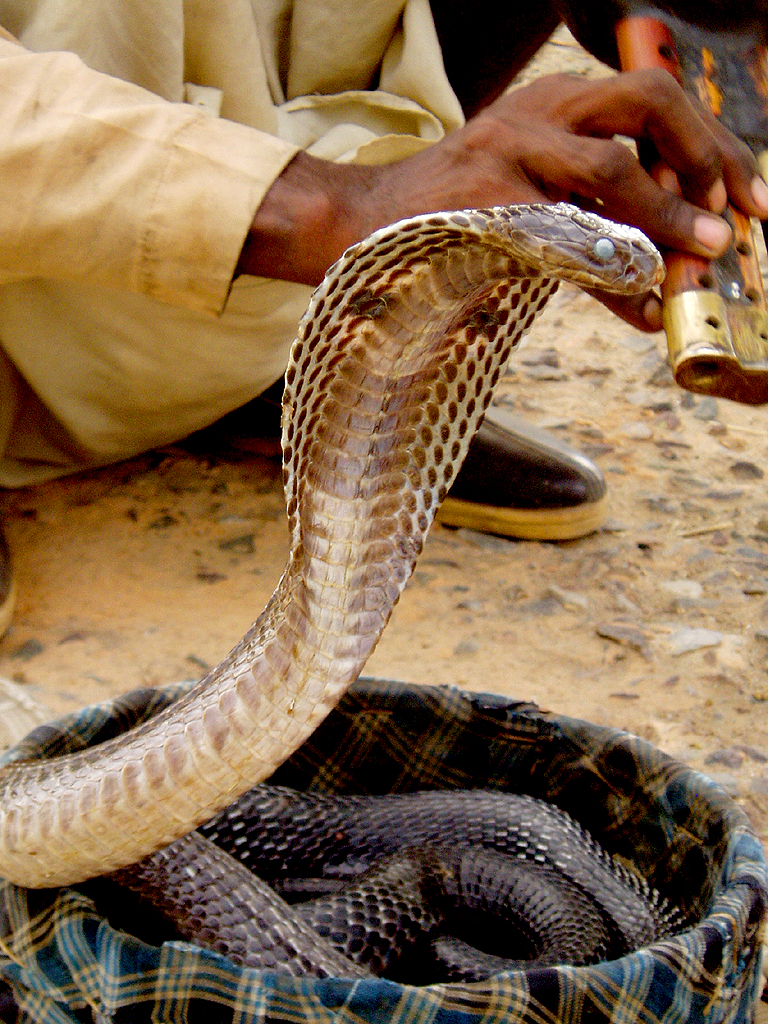
The Indian cobra is the most common subject of snake charmings.

In some parts of the world, especially in India, snake charming is a roadside show performed by a charmer. In such a show, the snake charmer carries a basket containing a snake that he seemingly charms by playing tunes with his flutelike musical instrument, to which the snake responds. The snake is in fact responding to the movement of the flute, not the sound it makes, as snakes lack external ears (though they do have internal ears).

The Wildlife Protection Act of 1972 in India technically prohibits snake charming on the grounds of reducing animal cruelty. Other types of snake charmers use a snake and mongoose show, where the two animals have a mock fight; however, this is not very common, as the animals may be seriously injured or killed. Snake charming as a profession is dying out in India because of competition from modern forms of entertainment and environment laws proscribing the practice. Many Indians have never seen snake charming and it is becoming a folktale of the past.

=== Trapping ===
The Irulas tribe of Andhra Pradesh and Tamil Nadu in India have been hunter-gatherers in the hot, dry plains forests, and have practiced the art of snake catching for generations. They have a vast knowledge of snakes in the field. They generally catch the snakes with the help of a simple stick. Earlier, the Irulas caught thousands of snakes for the snake-skin industry. After the complete ban of the snake-skin industry in India and protection of all snakes under the Indian Wildlife (Protection) Act 1972, they formed the Irula Snake Catcher's Cooperative and switched to catching snakes for removal of venom, releasing them in the wild after four extractions. The venom so collected is used for producing life-saving antivenom, biomedical research and for other medicinal products. The Irulas are also known to eat some of the snakes they catch and are very useful in rat extermination in the villages.

Despite the existence of snake charmers, there have also been professional snake catchers or wranglers. Modern-day snake trapping involves a herpetologist using a long stick with a V-shaped end. Some television show hosts, like Bill Haast, Austin Stevens, Steve Irwin, and Jeff Corwin, prefer to catch them using bare hands.

=== Consumption ===
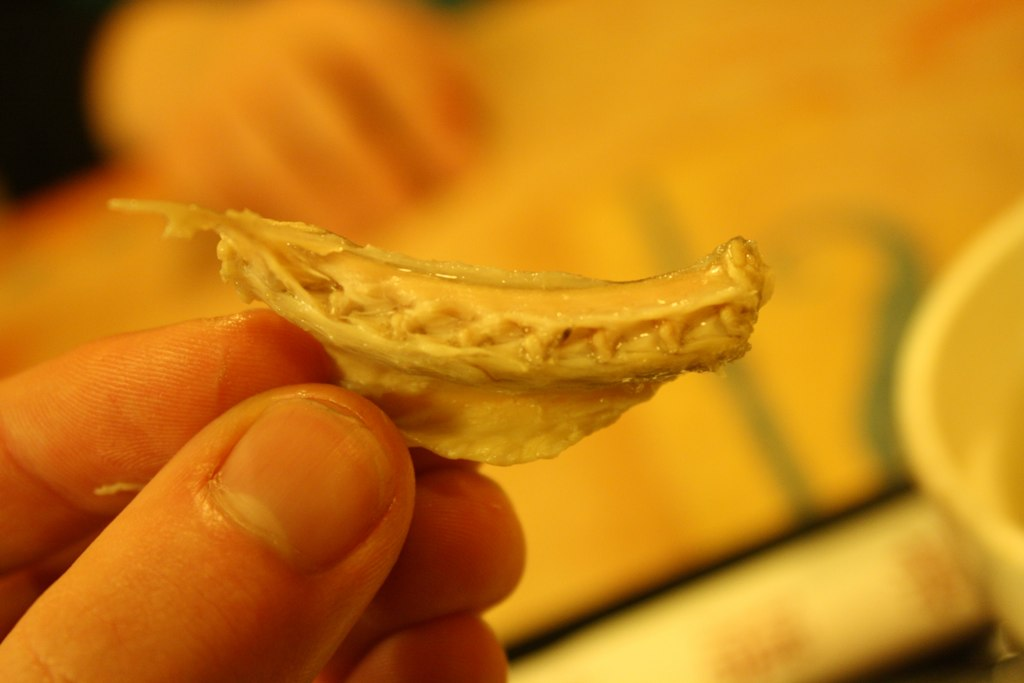
Snake meat, in a Taipei restaurant

Consuming snake flesh and related goods is a reflection of many cultures around the world, especially in Asian nations like China, Taiwan, Thailand, Indonesia, Vietnam, and Cambodia. Because of its supposed health benefits and aphrodisiac qualities, snake meat is frequently regarded as a delicacy and ingested. It is customary to drink wine laced with snake blood in an attempt to increase virility and vigor. Traditional Chinese medicine holds that snake wine, a traditional beverage infused with whole snakes, offers medicinal uses. However, using snake goods creates moral questions about conservation and animal welfare. It is important to pay attention to and regulate the sustainable harvesting of snakes for human food, particularly in areas where snake populations are in decline as a result of habitat degradation and overexploitation.

=== Pets ===
In the Western world, some snakes are kept as pets, especially docile species such as the ball python and corn snake. To meet the demand, a captive breeding industry has developed. Snakes bred in captivity are considered preferable to specimens caught in the wild and tend to make better pets. Compared with more traditional types of companion animal, snakes can be very low-maintenance pets; they require minimal space, as most common species do not exceed 5 feet (1.5 m) in length, and can be fed relatively infrequently—usually once every five to fourteen days. Certain snakes have a lifespan of more than 40 years if given proper care.

=== Symbolism ===
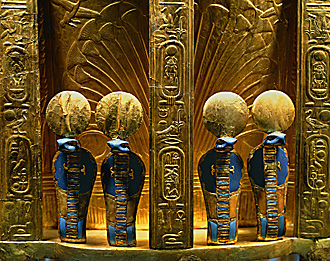
The reverse side of the throne of Pharaoh Tutankhamun with four golden uraeus cobra figures. Gold with lapis lazuli; Valley of the Kings, Thebes (1347–37 BCE).

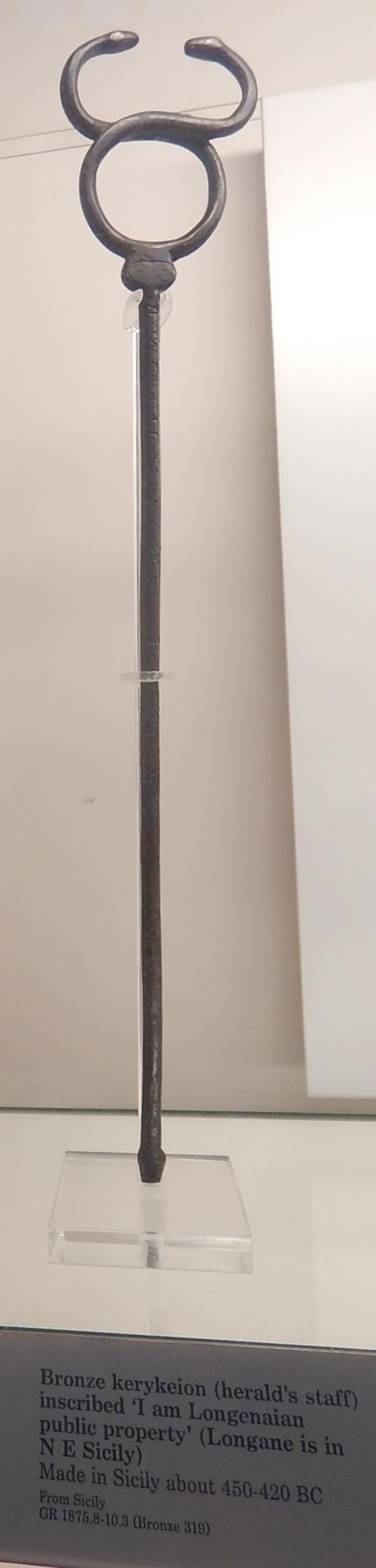
Snakes composing a bronze kerykeion from the mythical Longanus river in Sicily

In ancient Mesopotamia, Nirah, the messenger god of Ištaran, was represented as a serpent on kudurrus, or boundary stones. Representations of two intertwined serpents are common in Sumerian art and Neo-Sumerian artwork and still appear sporadically on cylinder seals and amulets until as late as the thirteenth century BC. The horned viper (Cerastes cerastes) appears in Kassite and Neo-Assyrian kudurrus and is invoked in Assyrian texts as a magical protective entity. A dragon-like creature with horns, the body and neck of a snake, the forelegs of a lion, and the hind-legs of a bird appears in Mesopotamian art from the Akkadian Period until the Hellenistic Period (323 BC–31 BC). This creature, known in Akkadian as the mušḫuššu, meaning "furious serpent", was used as a symbol for particular deities and also as a general protective emblem. It seems to have originally been the attendant of the Underworld god Ninazu, but later became the attendant to the Hurrian storm-god Tishpak, as well as, later, Ninazu's son Ningishzida, the Babylonian national god Marduk, the scribal god Nabu, and the Assyrian national god Ashur.

The ouroboros was a well-known ancient Egyptian symbol of a serpent swallowing its own tail. The precursor to the ouroboros was the "Many-Faced", a serpent with five heads, who, according to the Amduat, the oldest surviving Book of the Afterlife, was said to coil around the corpse of the sun god Ra protectively. The earliest surviving depiction of a "true" ouroboros comes from the gilded shrines in the tomb of Tutankhamun. In the early centuries AD, the ouroboros was adopted as a symbol by Gnostic Christians and chapter 136 of the Pistis Sophia, an early Gnostic text, describes "a great dragon whose tail is in its mouth". In medieval alchemy, the ouroboros became a typical western dragon with wings, legs, and a tail.

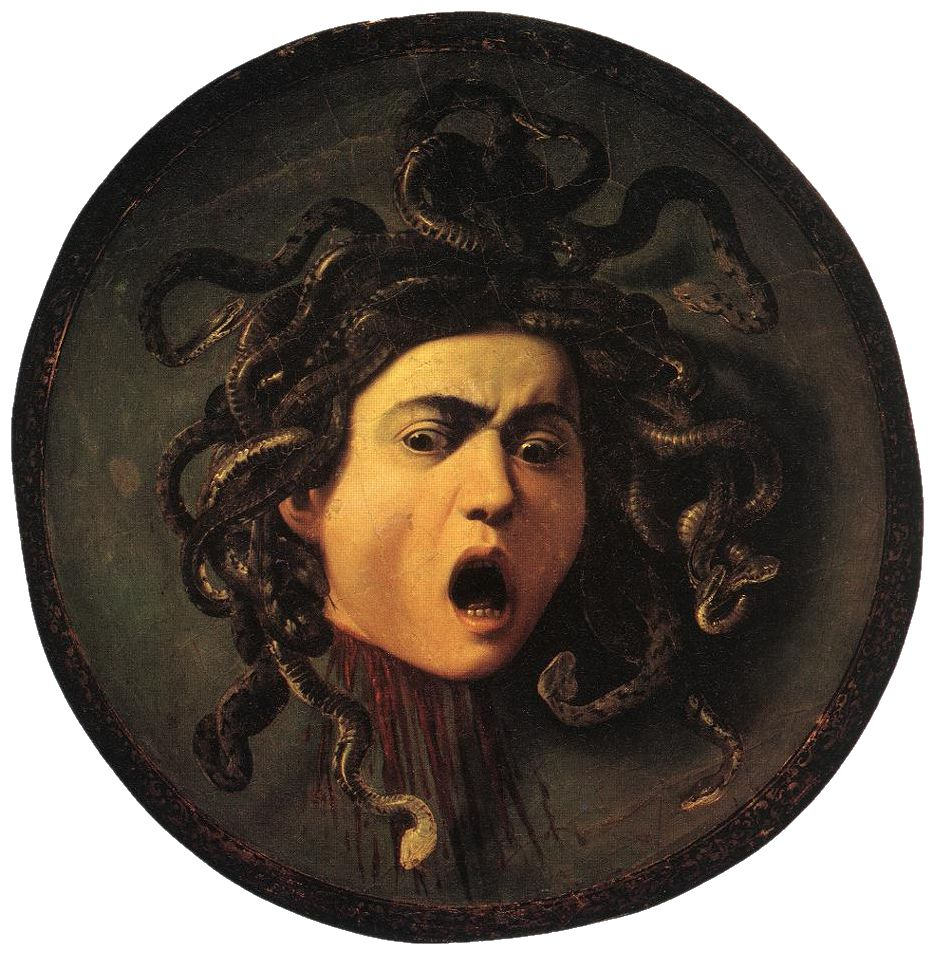
Medusa (1597) by the Italian artist Caravaggio

The ancient Greeks used the Gorgoneion, a depiction of a hideous face with serpents for hair, as an apotropaic symbol to ward off evil. In a Greek myth described by Pseudo-Apollodorus in his Bibliotheca, Medusa was a Gorgon with serpents for hair whose gaze turned all those who looked at her to stone and was slain by the hero Perseus. In the Roman poet Ovid's Metamorphoses, Medusa is said to have once been a beautiful priestess of Athena, whom Athena turned into a serpent-haired monster after she was raped by the god Poseidon in Athena's temple. In another myth referenced by the Boeotian poet Hesiod and described in detail by Pseudo-Apollodorus, the hero Heracles is said to have slain the Lernaean Hydra, a multiple-headed serpent which dwelt in the swamps of Lerna.

The legendary account of the foundation of Thebes mentioned a monster snake guarding the spring from which the new settlement was to draw its water. In fighting and killing the snake, the companions of the founder Cadmus all perished—leading to the term "Cadmean victory" (i.e. a victory involving one's own ruin).

Rod of Asclepius, in which the snake, through ecdysis, symbolizes healing

Three medical symbols involving snakes that are still used today are Bowl of Hygieia, symbolizing pharmacy, and the Caduceus and Rod of Asclepius, which are symbols denoting medicine in general.

India is often called the land of snakes and is steeped in tradition regarding snakes. Snakes are worshipped as gods even today with many women pouring milk on snake pits (despite snakes' aversion for milk). The cobra is seen on the neck of Shiva and Vishnu is depicted often as sleeping on a seven-headed snake or within the coils of a serpent. There are also several temples in India solely for cobras sometimes called Nagraj (King of Snakes) and it is believed that snakes are symbols of fertility. There is a Hindu festival called Nag Panchami each year on which day snakes are venerated and prayed to. See also Nāga.

The snake is one of the 12 celestial animals of Chinese zodiac, in the Chinese calendar.

Many ancient Peruvian cultures worshipped nature. They often depicted snakes in their art.

=== Religion ===
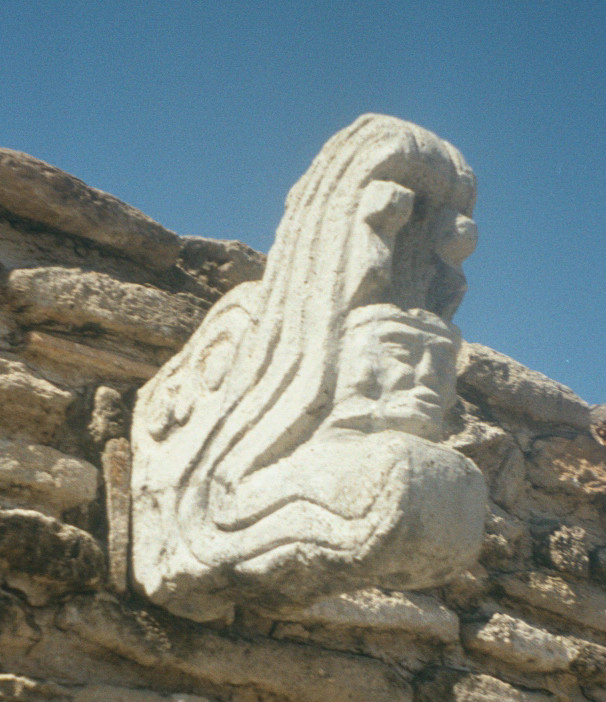
Ballcourt marker from the Postclassic site of Mixco Viejo in Guatemala. This sculpture depicts Kukulkan, jaws agape, with the head of a human warrior emerging from his maw.

Snakes are used in Hinduism as a part of ritual worship. In the annual Nag Panchami festival, participants worship either live cobras or images of Nāgas. Lord Shiva is depicted in most images with a snake coiled around his neck. Puranic literature includes various stories associated with snakes, for example Shesha is said to hold all the planets of the Universe on his hoods. Other notable snakes in Hinduism are Vasuki, Takshaka, Karkotaka, and Pingala. The term Nāga is used to refer to entities that take the form of large snakes in Hinduism and Buddhism.

Snakes have been widely revered in many cultures, such as in ancient Greece where the serpent was seen as a healer. Asclepius carried a serpent wound around his wand, a symbol seen today on many ambulances.

In religious terms, the snake and jaguar were arguably the most important animals in ancient Mesoamerica. "In states of ecstasy, lords dance a serpent dance; great descending snakes adorn and support buildings from Chichen Itza to Tenochtitlan, and the Nahuatl word coatl meaning serpent or twin, forms part of primary deities such as Mixcoatl, Quetzalcoatl, and Coatlicue." In the Maya and Aztec calendars, the fifth day sign of the 20-day cycle was "Snake".

In Christianity and Judaism, a snake appears before Adam and Eve and tempts them with the forbidden fruit from the Tree of Knowledge. The snake returns in the Book of Exodus when Moses turns his staff into a snake as a sign of God's power, and later when he makes the Nehushtan, a bronze snake on a pole that when looked at cured the people of bites from the snakes that plagued them in the desert. The serpent makes its final appearance symbolizing Satan in the Book of Revelation. Snake handlers use snakes as an integral part of church worship, to demonstrate their faith in divine protection. However, more commonly in Christianity, the serpent has been depicted as a representative of evil and sly plotting, as seen in the description in Genesis. Saint Patrick is purported to have expelled all snakes from Ireland while converting the country to Christianity in the 5th century, thus explaining the absence of snakes there.

In Neo-Paganism and Wicca, the snake is seen as a symbol of wisdom and knowledge. Snakes are sometimes associated with Hecate, the Greek goddess of witchcraft.

=== Medicine ===
Several compounds from snake venoms are being researched as potential treatments or preventatives for pain, cancers, arthritis, stroke, heart disease, hemophilia, and hypertension, as well as to control bleeding (e.g., during surgery).

== See also ==
- Limbless vertebrates
- List of largest snakes
- List of Serpentes families
- List of snakes
- Ophiology
- Snake detection theory
- Spinal osteoarthropathy (reptile disease)
- The New Encyclopedia of Snakes
- The Snakes of Europe

=== Bibliography ===
- Behler JL, King FW (1979). The Audubon Society Field Guide to Reptiles and Amphibians of North America. New York: Alfred A. Knopf. p. 581. ISBN 978-0-394-50824-5.
- Boulenger, G. A. (1913), The Snakes of Europe, Metheun & Co. Ltd.
- Campbell, Sheldon; Shaw, Charles E. (1974). Snakes of The American West. New York: Alfred A. Knopf. ISBN 978-0-394-48882-0.
- Cogger H, Zweifel R (1992). Reptiles & Amphibians. Sydney: Weldon Owen. ISBN 978-0-8317-2786-4.
- Deane, John (1833). The Worship of the Serpent. Whitefish, Montana: Kessinger Publishing. p. 412. ISBN 978-1-56459-898-1. Archived from the original on 9 October 2019.
- Freiberg M, Walls J (1984). The World of Venomous Animals. New Jersey: TFH Publications. ISBN 978-0-87666-567-1.
