= Snakes of Nigeria =

A number of snake species occur in Nigeria. Of these only two are endemic to the country: Gonionotophis egbensis, a file snake, and Tricheilostoma greenwelli, a threadsnake.

== Species ==
=== Venomous ===
Venomous species occurring in Nigeria are in the families Viperidae, Elapidae, and Atractaspidinae.

Viperidae include the carpet viper, the puff adder, the Gaboon viper, and the night adder. They are characterised by their heavily built muscular bodies with black patches for camouflage.

Elapidae include the black-necked spitting cobra, the Egyptian cobra and the Mali cobra.

Atractaspidinae are a family of small, inoffensive snakes with low chances of envenoming. Native examples include mole vipers, stiletto snakes, and burrowing asps.

Most cases of envenomation are caused by the West African carpet viper, the black-necked spitting cobra, and the puff adder.

=== Non-venomous ===
Non-venomous snakes include examples from the Colubridae and the pythons.
