= Acutodon =

Acutodon Temporal range: Late Cretaceous (early Campanian), 83.5–79.5 Ma

Scientific classification
- Kingdom: Animalia
- Phylum: Chordata
- Class: Reptilia
- Order: Squamata
- Suborder: Anguimorpha
- Clade: Shinisauria
- Genus: †Acutodon; Jansen et al., 2026
- Species: †A. villeveyracensis

Binomial name
- †Acutodon villeveyracensis Jansen et al., 2026

Genus of extinct lizard

Acutodon (lit. 'sharp, pointed teeth') is an extinct genus of shinisaurian lizard that lived in France during the Late Cretaceous (lower Campanian age). The genus contains a single species, Acutodon villeveyracensis, known from a partial maxilla (upper tooth-bearing bone). Acutodon lived in freshwater subtropical environments.

== Description ==
It is characterized by its long, tapering teeth, which suggest a diet of small fish and amphibians. This is comparable to the modern Chinese crocodile lizard (Shinisaurus crocodilurus).

== Phylogeny ==
Acutodon is a Pan-Shinisauria, a clade of Anguimorph lizards that contains genera such as Merkurosaurus from the Czech Republic. The closest living relative to Acutodon is the Chinese crocodile lizard. The evolutionary history of this clade is poorly known with few fossils being found. This genus fills in a gap in the fossil record of Pan-Shinisaurids.
