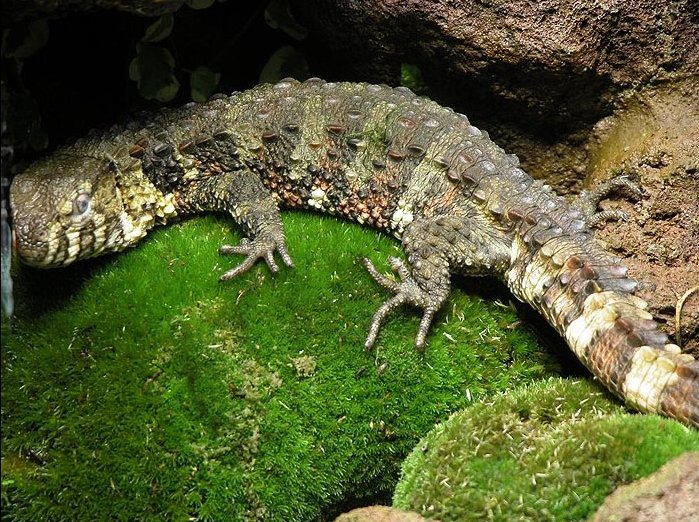
- The Chinese crocodile lizard, the only living member of Shinisauria (Shinisaurus).

Scientific classification
- Kingdom: Animalia
- Phylum: Chordata
- Class: Reptilia
- Order: Squamata
- Suborder: Anguimorpha
- Infraorder: Paleoanguimorpha
- Clade: Shinisauria; Conrad, 2008

Subgroups
- Shinisaurus; †Acutodon; †Dalinghosaurus; †Merkurosaurus; †Bahndwivici

= Shinisauria =

Shinisauria Temporal range: Early Cretaceous - present, 124.6–0 Ma

Clade of lizards

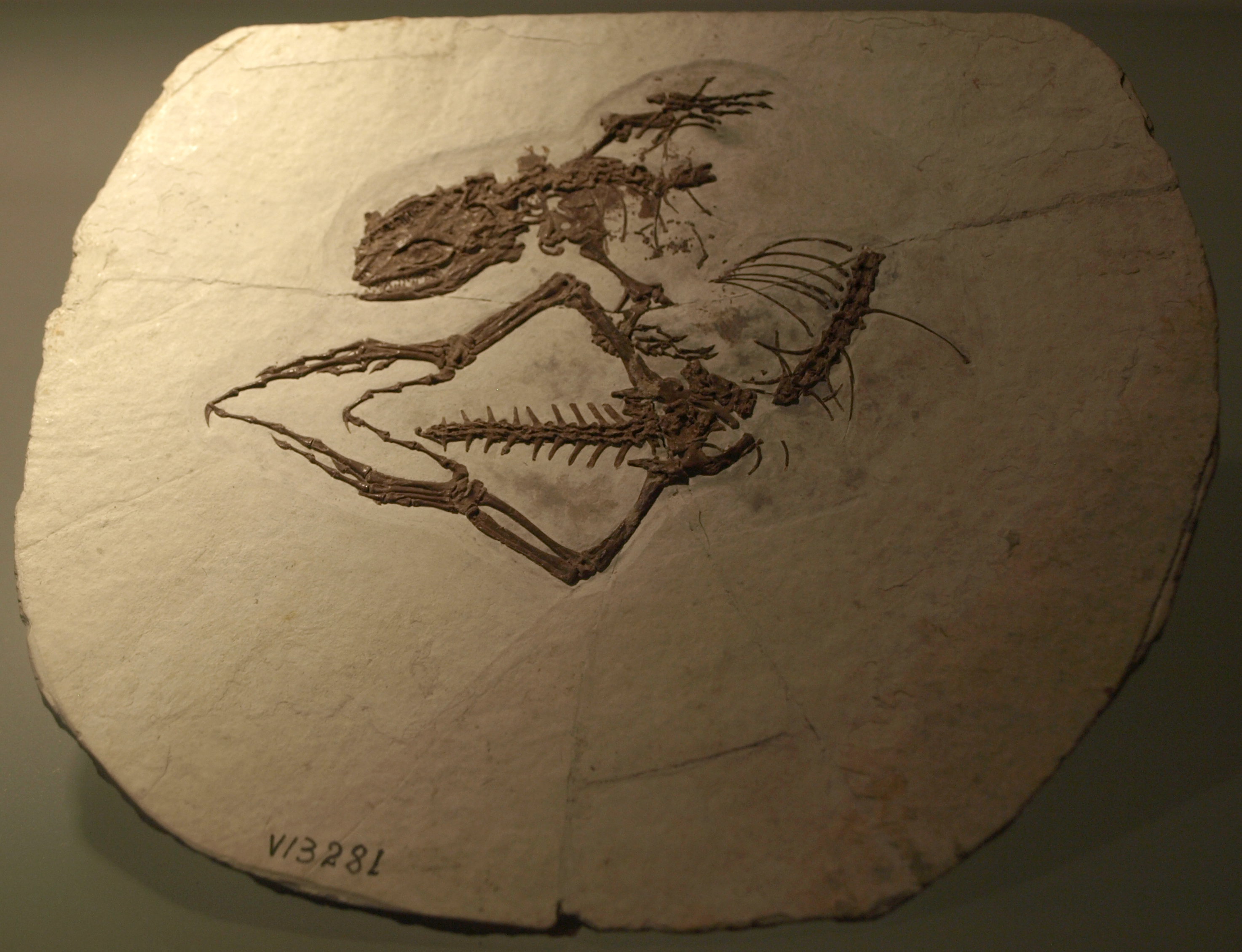
Fossil of Dalinghosaurus longidigitus, the oldest known shinisaurian

Shinisauria is a clade or evolutionary grouping of anguimorph lizards that includes the living Chinese crocodile lizard Shinisaurus and several of its closest extinct relatives. Shinisauria was named in 2008 by Jack Lee Conrad as a stem-based taxon to include all anguimorphs more closely related to Shinisaurus than to Anguis fragilis, Heloderma suspectum or Varanus varius. Several recent phylogenetic analyses of lizard evolutionary relationships place Shinisauria in a basal position within the clade Platynota, which also includes monitor lizards, helodermatids, and the extinct mosasaurs. Shinisaurians were once thought to be closely related to the genus Xenosaurus, but they are now considered distant relatives within Anguimorpha. The fossil record of shinisaurians extends back to the Early Cretaceous with Dalinghosaurus, which is from the Aptian aged Yixian Formation of China. Two other extinct shinisaurians are currently known: Bahndwivici from the Eocene of Wyoming and Merkurosaurus from the Late Oligocene of Germany and the Early Miocene of the Czech Republic. An indeterminate shinisaurian is known from an isolated tail found in the Eocene aged Messel pit in Germany.
