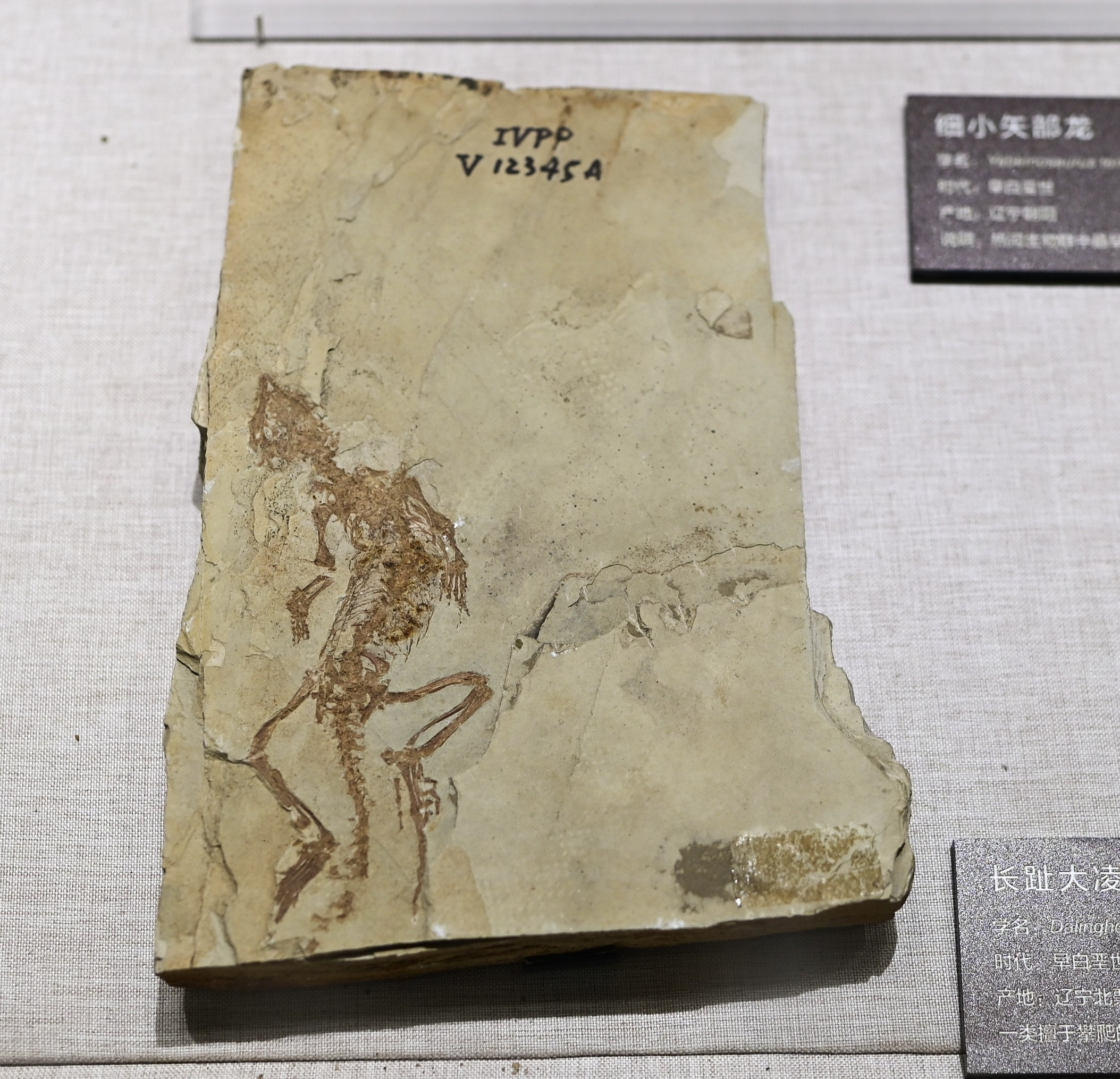
- Fossil specimen, Baoding Natural History Museum

Scientific classification
- Kingdom: Animalia
- Phylum: Chordata
- Class: Reptilia
- Order: Squamata
- Suborder: Anguimorpha
- Infraorder: Paleoanguimorpha
- Clade: Shinisauria
- Genus: †Dalinghosaurus
- Species: †D. longidigitus

Binomial name
- †Dalinghosaurus longidigitus Ji, 1998

= Dalinghosaurus =

Dalinghosaurus Temporal range: Early Cretaceous, ~126.4–122.46 Ma

Extinct genus of lizards

Dalinghosaurus (often incorrectly spelled "Dalinghesaurus") is an extinct genus of lizards, first described in 1998 by S.A. Ji of the Peking University Department of Geology. The type species is Dalinghosaurus longidigitus. It is known from the Early Cretaceous (Aptian) aged Yixian Formation of Liaoning, China.

== Description ==
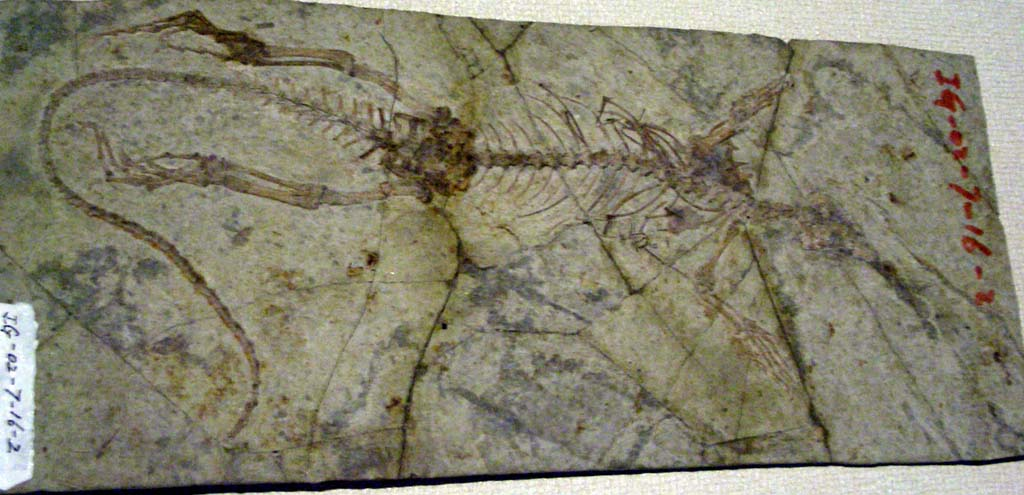
Dalinghosaurus longidigitus fossil displayed in Hong Kong Science Museum

Dalinghosaurus had extremely long tails and hindlimbs relative to its forelimbs. The claws are relatively slender.

Eleven specimens of Dalinghosaurus are held by the IVPP in Beijing. One fossil skeleton contains the skeletons of ten or more juveniles. A possible specimen of Dalinghosaurus has been found in the gut region of a Sinosauropteryx.

== Classification ==
Although it lived during the Early Cretaceous, A 2005 study found that Dalinghosaurus was related to several modern-day lizards in the family Xenosauridae, the knob-scaled lizards. Its relatives include the modern Chinese crocodile lizard (Shinisaurus) of southern China, the extinct Exostinus of Montana and Wyoming, and the extinct Carusia of Mongolia. It is differentiated from Carusia by having fewer, more conical shaped teeth. Differences in skull and mandible shape separate it from Shinisaurus.

== Paleobiology ==
The long legs of Dalinghosaurus indicate that it was a proficient runner across open environments, potentially capable of bipedal locomotion. However, it may also have been capable of arboreal locomotion.
