= Lee Craig =

American paleontologist

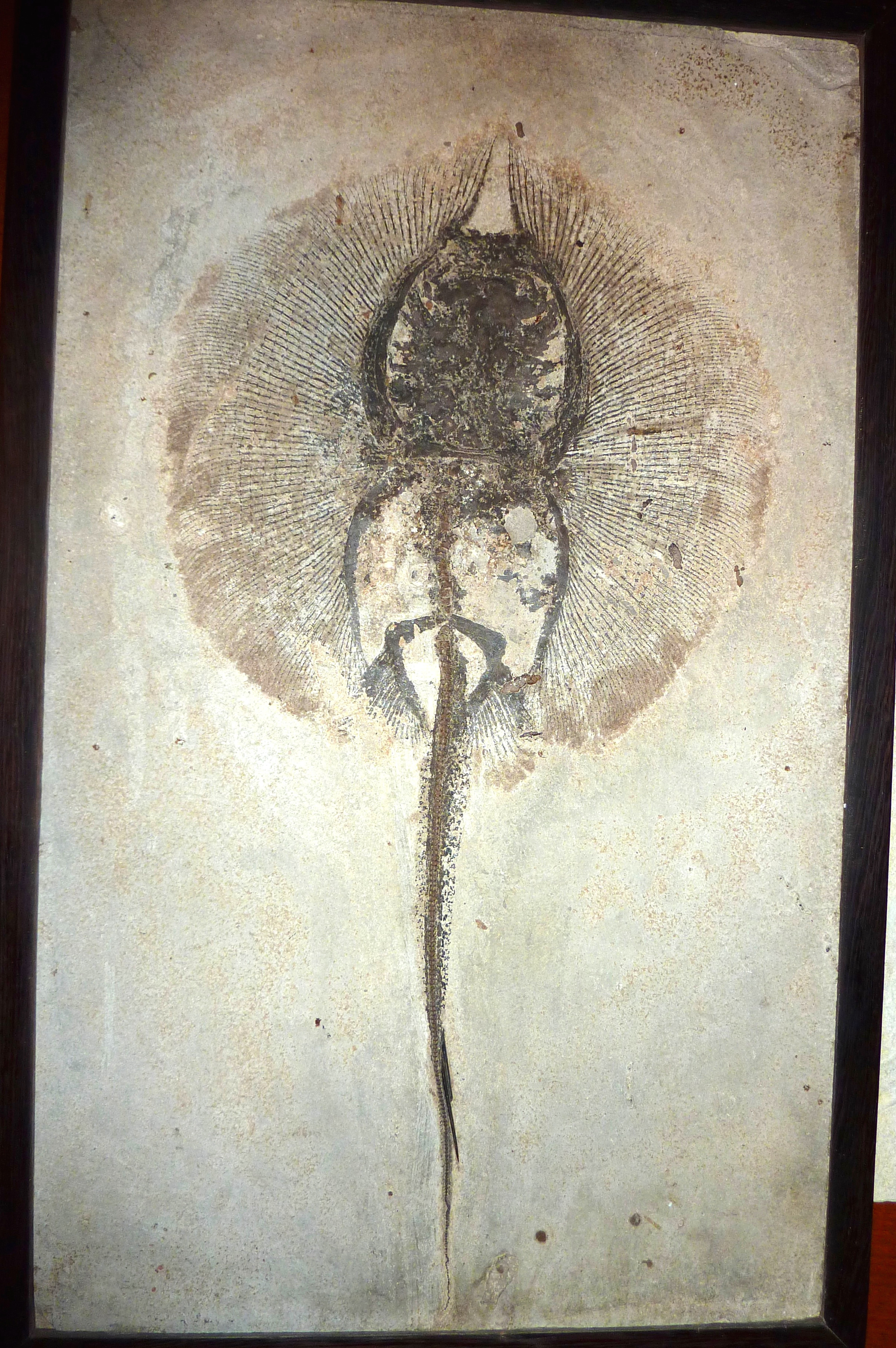
Stingray prepared by R. Lee Craig (Asterotrygon maloneyi). In the collection of Fossil Shack. Prepared Circa 1920.

Robert Lee Craig "Peg-leg" (1866–1938) was one of the early full-time fossil quarriers in America. He worked in the Green River Formation of Wyoming, near the town of Kemmerer. Between 1897 and 1937, Craig worked a fossil layer known as the 18-inch layer. He had lost a leg in a mining accident several years earlier and carved wooden legs from barrel staves, which earned him the name "Peg-Leg".

R. Lee Graig prepared his fossils using a pocket knife, which is very different than the tools used to prepare the fossils today. Craig made a good living selling his fish to travelers, and at local carnivals and fairs.

Late in his life, Craig hired two men to help with his fossil business. One night, these men beat Craig, tied him up and set his tent on fire in an effort to rob him. Craig managed to escape the fire and was taken to a local hospital. Craig never fully recovered and died in 1938 at the age of 72. He was buried in the Kemmerer cemetery.

== See also ==
- Fossil Butte National Monument
