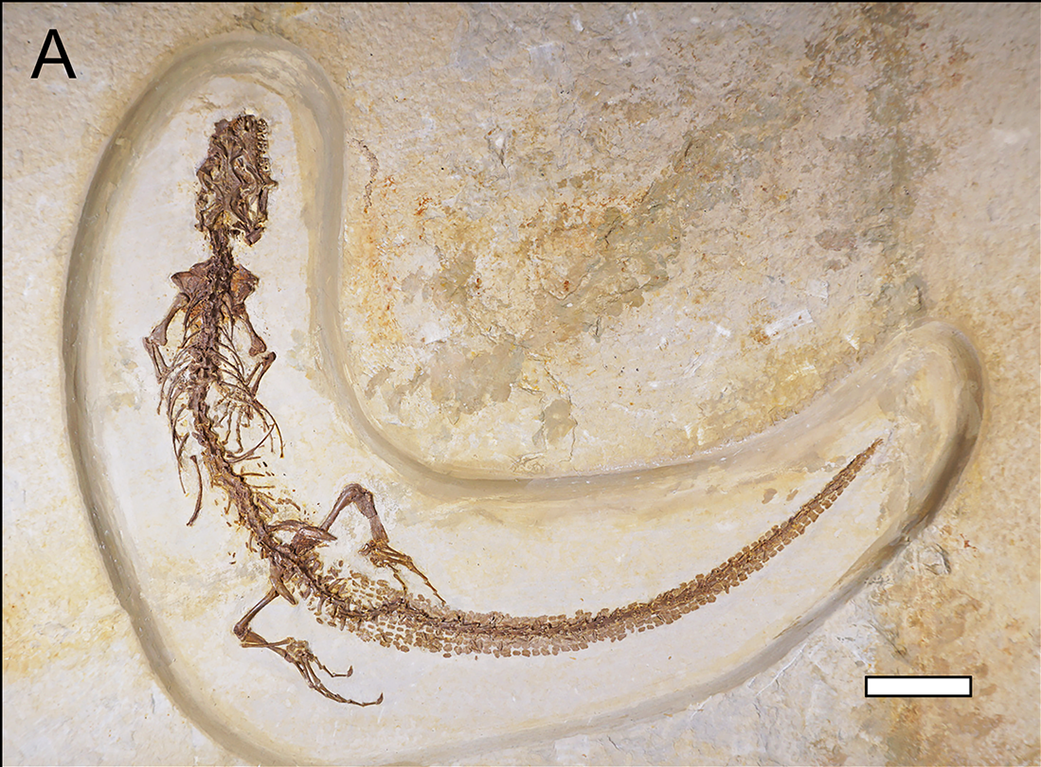
- holotype

Scientific classification
- Kingdom: Animalia
- Phylum: Chordata
- Class: Reptilia
- Order: Squamata
- Suborder: Anguimorpha
- Family: Shinisauridae
- Genus: †Bahndwivici
- Species: †B. ammoskius

Binomial name
- †Bahndwivici ammoskius Conrad, 2006

= Bahndwivici =

Bahndwivici Temporal range: Eocene, 52–51 Ma

Extinct genus of lizards

Bahndwivici is an extinct genus of lizard known from a nearly complete and articulated skeleton discovered in rocks of the Green River Formation of Wyoming, United States. The skeleton is very similar to that of the modern Chinese crocodile lizard, Shinisaurus.

== Description ==
Bahndwicivi is based on FMNH PR2260, a skeleton collected from the Thompson Ranch Locality of the Fossil Butte Member of the Green River Formation. It was described in 2006 by Jack Conrad. The type species is B. ammoskius. The genus name means "handsome in the water" in Shoshoni, a reference both to the animal's possible semiaquatic lifestyle and to the Shoshone people who once lived in the area. The specific name is a combination of the Ancient Greek words for sandy (ammos) and shade (skia), referring to its habitat.

FMNH PR2260 is more or less complete, primarily lacking some bones from the rear of the skull. The skeleton is well-articulated, with numerous rows of osteoderms remaining in place beneath the tail, but is somewhat flattened. The animal appears to have been an adult when it died. It differs from Shinisaurus in a few details. For example, FMNH PR2260 had a proportionally longer snout and an additional tooth in the upper jaw, and its postorbital and postfrontal bones were not fused.

== Paleoecology ==
Bahndwivici is one of several lizards known from the Fossil Butte Member of the Green River Formation. This rock unit represents part of Fossil Lake, the smallest and shortest-lived of three prehistoric lake systems that make up the Green River Formation. The lake sediments include a volcanic ash dating to 51.66 million years ago, during the Early Eocene. Fossils are abundant in the rocks of Fossil Lake, and illustrate a diverse assemblage of plants, bivalves, snails, crustaceans, insects, rays, bony fish, salamanders, turtles, lizards, snakes, crocodilians, birds, and mammals.
