= Wyoming Dinosaur Center =

Dinosaur museum in Wyoming, United States

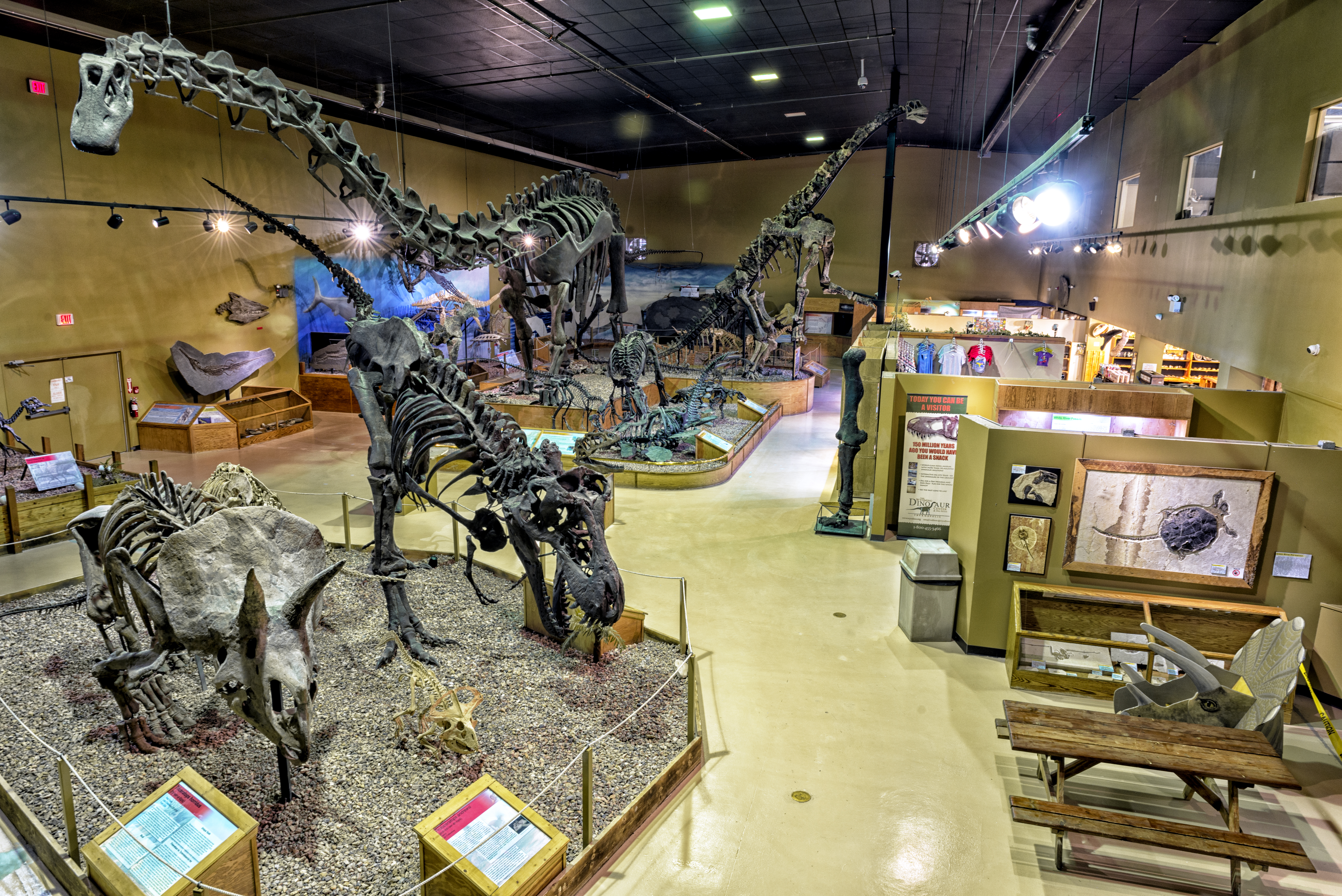
- Established: 1995
- Location: 110 Carter Ranch Rd. East Thermopolis, Wyoming, United States
- Coordinates: 43.64297°N 108.199754°W
- Type: Nonprofit
- Website: Official website

The Wyoming Dinosaur Center is located in East Thermopolis, Wyoming and is one of the few dinosaur museums in the world to have excavation sites within driving distance. The museum displays the Thermopolis Specimen of Archaeopteryx, which is one of only two real specimens of this genus on display outside of Europe.

Fifteen minutes from the museum are its many dig sites, located on Warm Springs Ranch. More than 10,000 bones have been discovered and excavated, most of which are either on display or stored just down the hill at the museum. One of the most notable fossil assemblies on the property is from the "Something Interesting," or SI, excavation site. This site presents the rare occurrence of both dinosaur trace fossils and body fossils including footprints of many sauropods and Allosaurus as well as skeletal remains from Camarasaurus, Diplodocus, and Apatosaurus—three of the sauropods most common in the area during the Late Jurassic. Most of the bones belong to a juvenile (30 foot long) Camarasaurus that was scavenged by many Allosaurs. This is known based on the presence of both teeth and claw marks on many of the bones present as well as an abundance of shed Allosaur teeth (more than 100) found among the bone debris. Research conducted by Debra Jennings back in 2006, determined that the bones were accumulated in the past when the site was part of a shallow alkaline lake. There are in fact at least two separate layers of bone bearing material created as the lake expanded and shrank with changes in the environment over time.(Jennings 2006).

VOA report about the museum

== Dig sites ==
Other dig sites include "Foot Site" or FS, which contains parts of at least three juvenile diplodocid with articulated hands and feet, "There You Are" or TYA, which contains the remains of multiple Allosaurs and has not been worked on over the past few years due to the discovery of a site called "Above There You Are" or ATYA, which contains the remains of what currently appears to be a single very young Diplodocid. One of the oldest sites on the property is called "Beside Sauropod" or BS, which has been active for over 20 years and produced over 1800 bones to date. Included at the site are at least 6 Camarasaurs and a partial Apatosaur as well as dozens of shed Allosaur teeth.

There are many more inactive sites found around the property including "Don't Fall," "Bone Bed," "Above Bone Bed," "West to Beside Sauropod," "Laura's Apatosaur," and "Cheryl's Blind" just to name a few. Out of all the dig sites discovered, the main concentration of bones belongs to one of the four following genera: Apatosaurus, Camarasaurus, Diplodocus or Allosaurus.

During the winter, the excavation sites are closed to visitors, but over the summer months (late-May to mid-September) active digging occurs every day (weather permitting).

== Collections and exhibits ==
The museum is open all year round and hosts a gallery with more than 50 mounted skeletons, including a full mount of Supersaurus vivianae excavated from a quarry near Douglas, Wyoming. The replica skeleton on display is 106 feet long and is the first mount based on data from the second and most complete Supersaurus ever found affectionately named "Jimbo" (WDC DMJ-001) which was donated to the museum in 2003. Other dinosaurs present include a T rex, Triceratops, Medusaceratops as well as various Hadrosaurs, Stegosaurs and Allosaurs. One of the newest members to the museum is the almost 90% complete, composite skeleton of a Camarasaurus found on the property by staff and visitors, excavated over the past 20 years. There is also a collection of real and replica marine reptiles, and flying reptiles. From these times before and after the dinosaurs, the museum hosts an impressive display of pre-Mesozoic fossils, including numerous Devonian fish and invertebrates. The more modern displays include fossil camels, horses, rodents and nimravids (sabretooth cat like animals).

The museum also houses a fully functional preparation lab, where staff and visitors can be seen cleaning, repairing and preserving fossils found on the property as well as from other locations around the country, all year long.

== Programs ==
The Wyoming Dinosaur Center offers many programs that allow visitors to dig up dinosaurs. Starting end of May (depending on the weather) the Dig for the Day program starts. This program is for families and individuals that are interested in learning more about paleontology. The Dig for the Day begins at 8am and finishes at 5pm. All fossils found remain at the museum for science and research. Throughout the summer, many dates are available for the Kids' Dig. Children ages 8 to 12 learn all aspect of what The Wyoming Dinosaur Center does. They dig, work in the prep lab removing matrix from dinosaur bones and they learn molding and casting. Other programs include Dinosaur Academy, Senior Activities and Paleo Prep program.

== Gallery ==
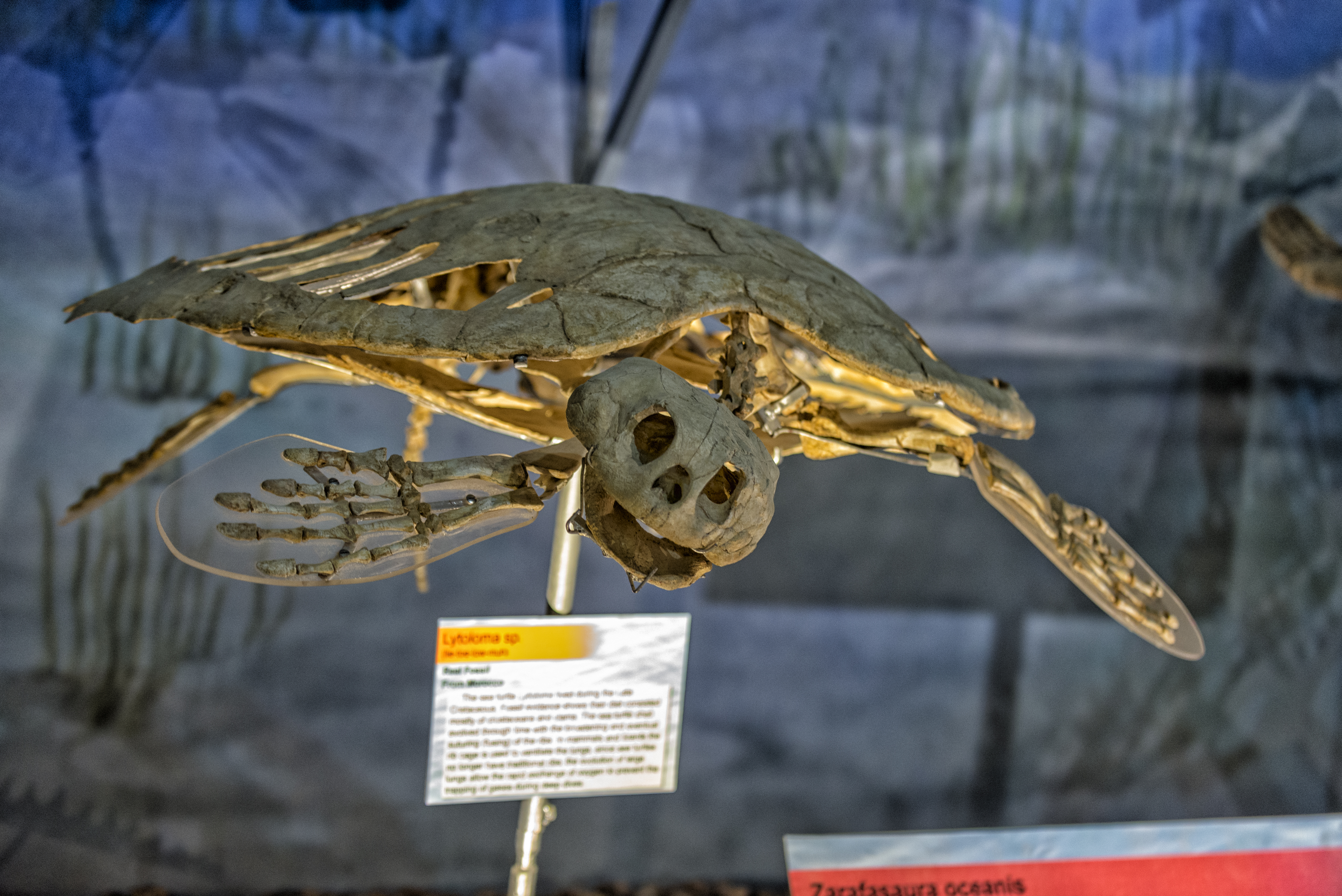
A fossil sea turtle on display

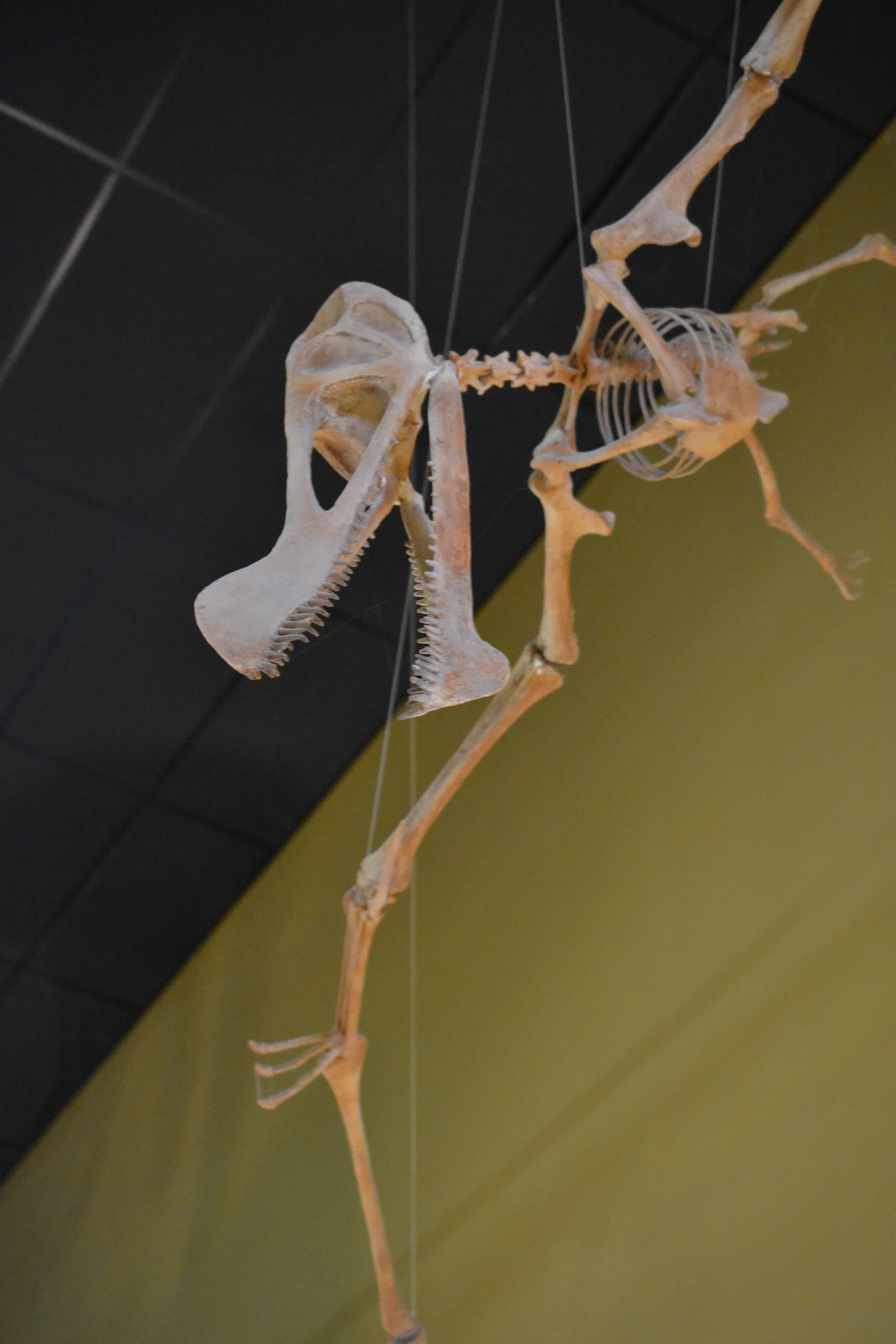
A Reconstructed skeleton of the Santanadactylus

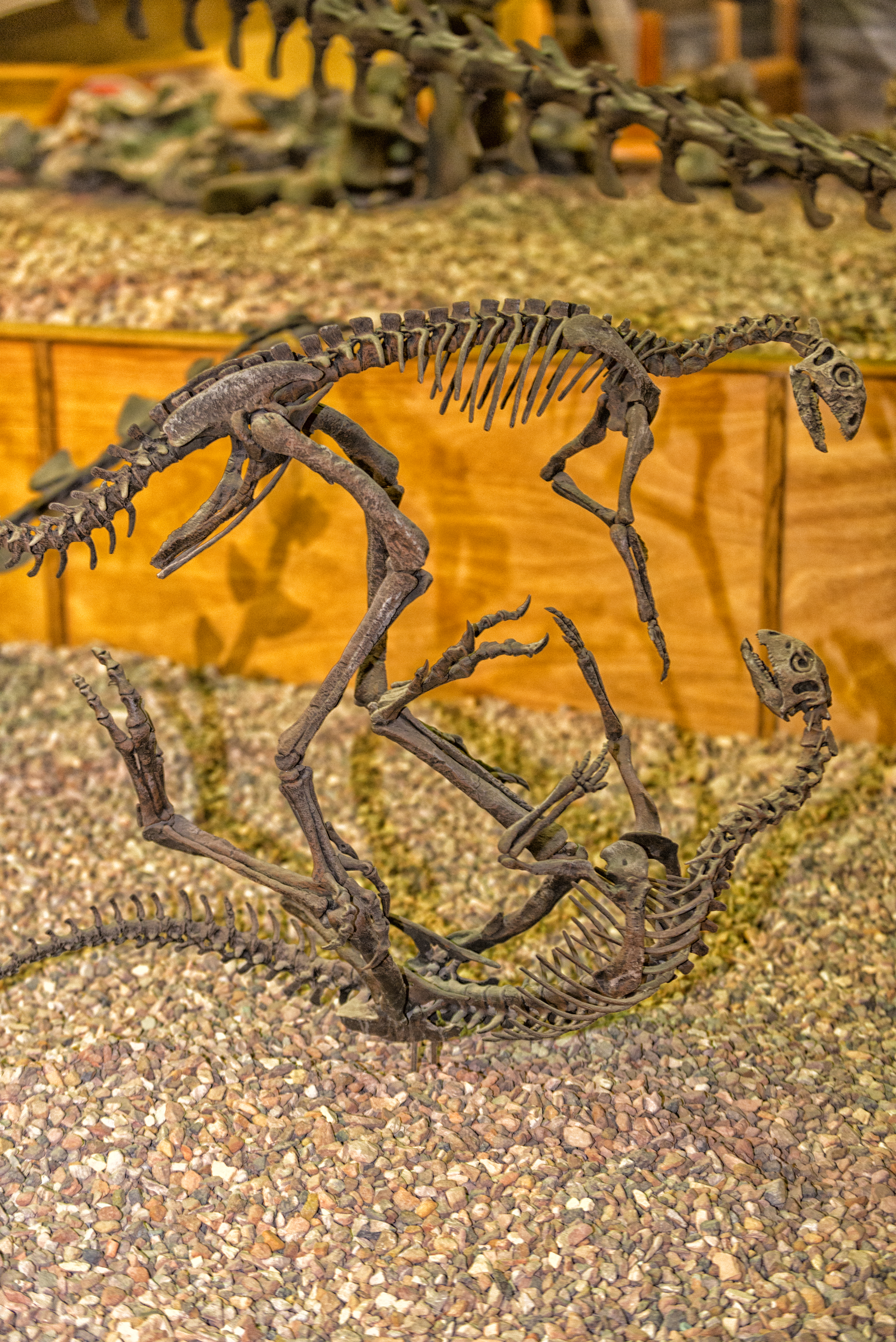
A pair of replica Othnielia spar

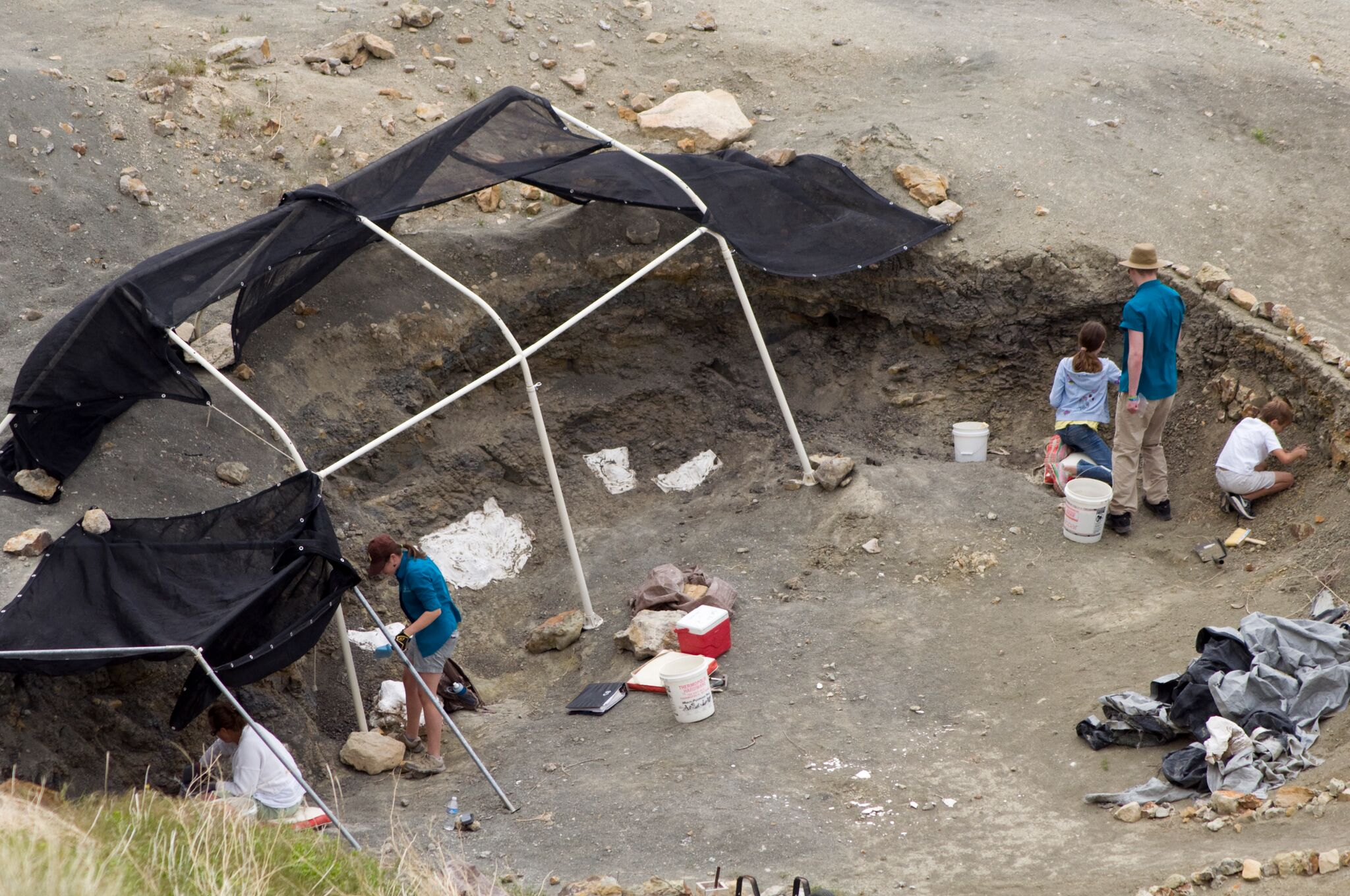
Excavations at the 'Beside Sauropod' Quarry

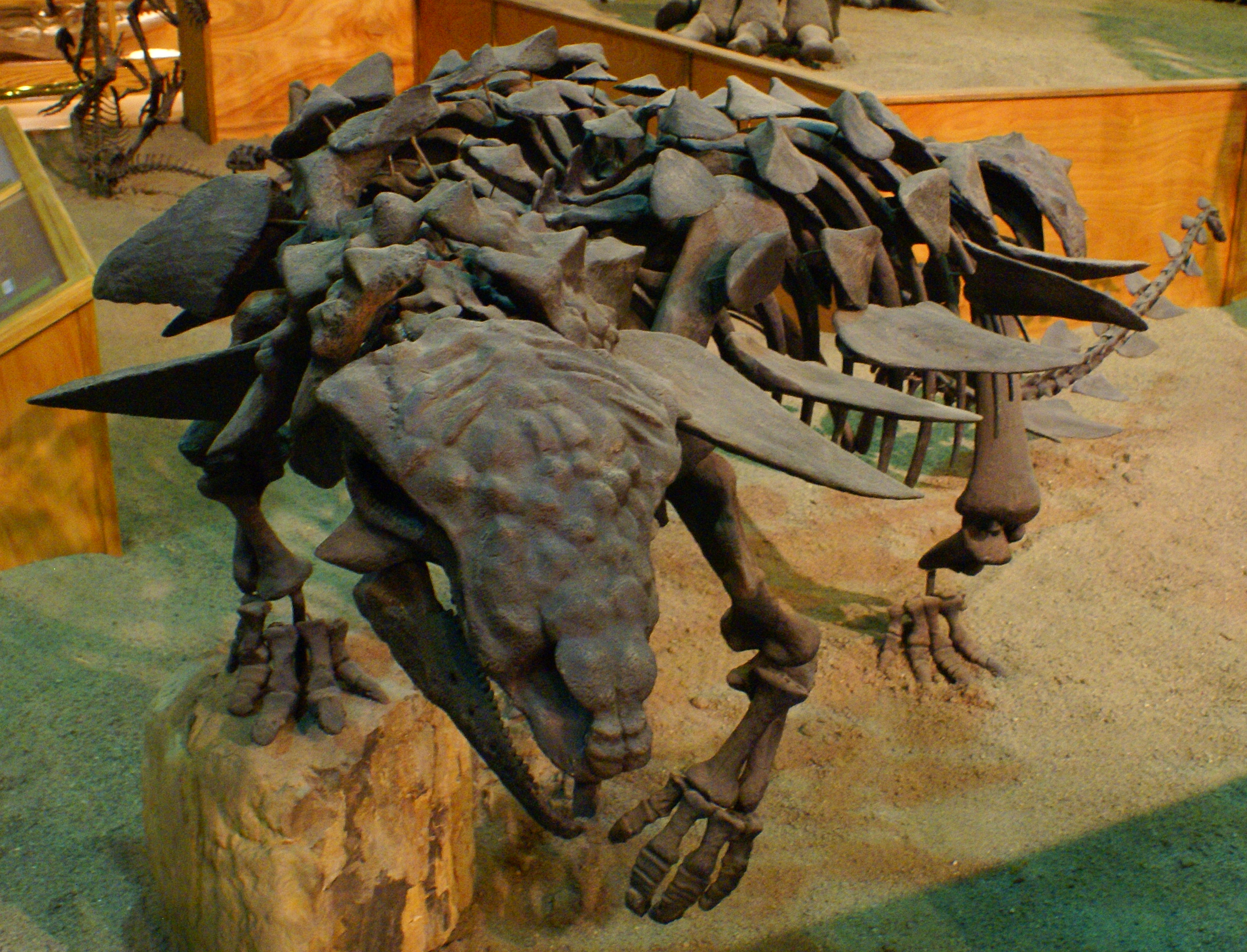
A replica Mymoorapelta on display

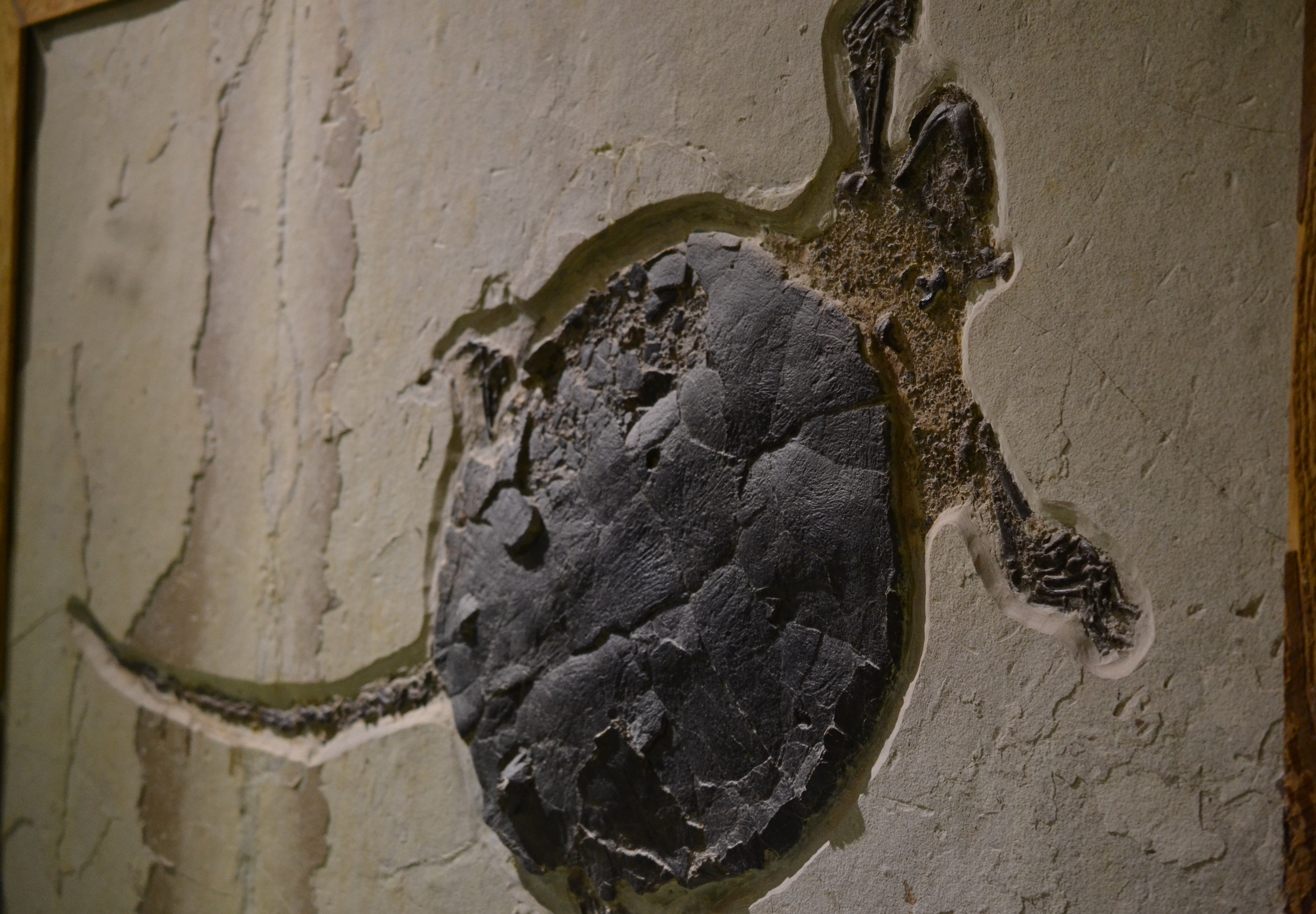
A fossil turtle from the Green River Formation in southwestern Wyoming

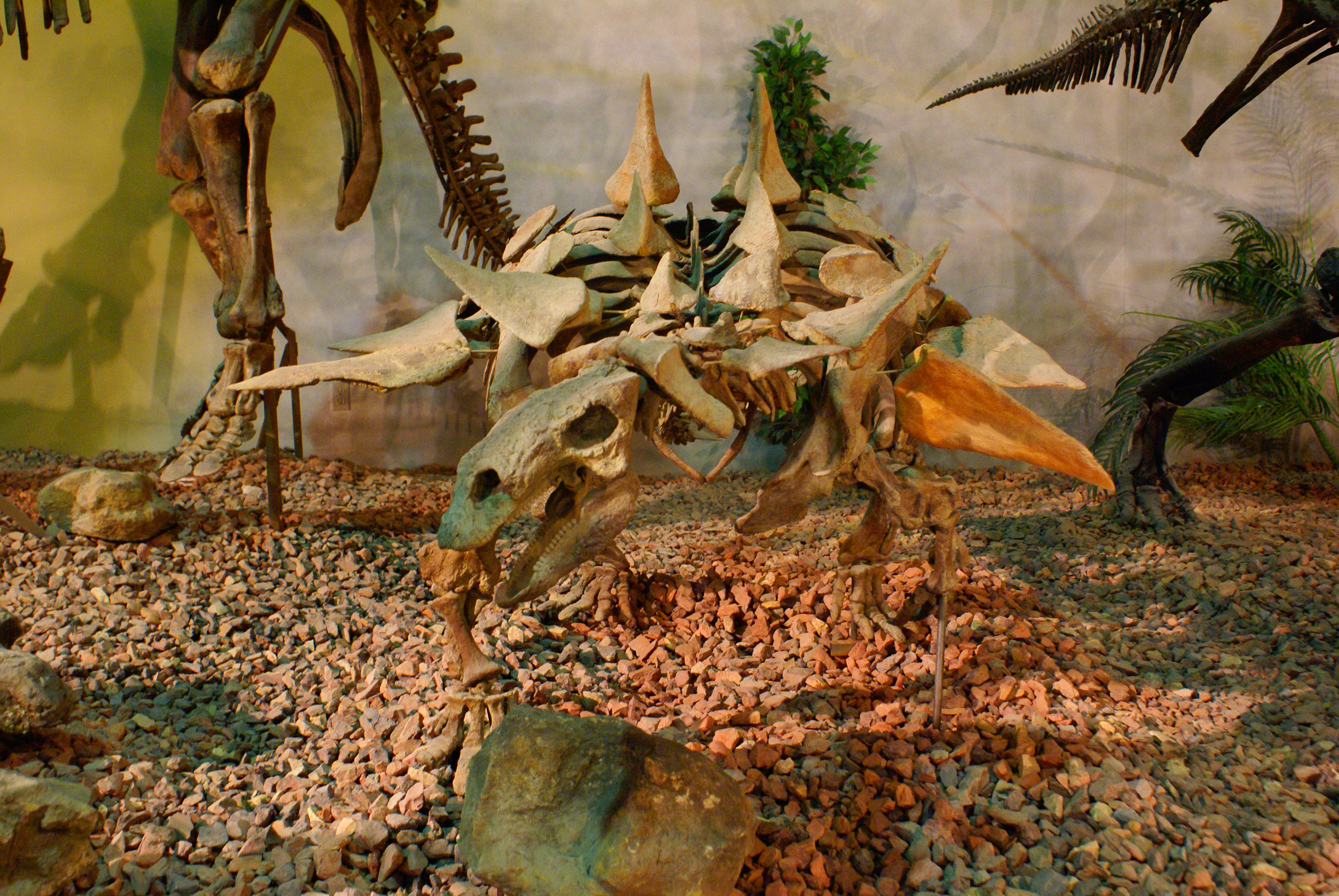
A replica Gastonia on display

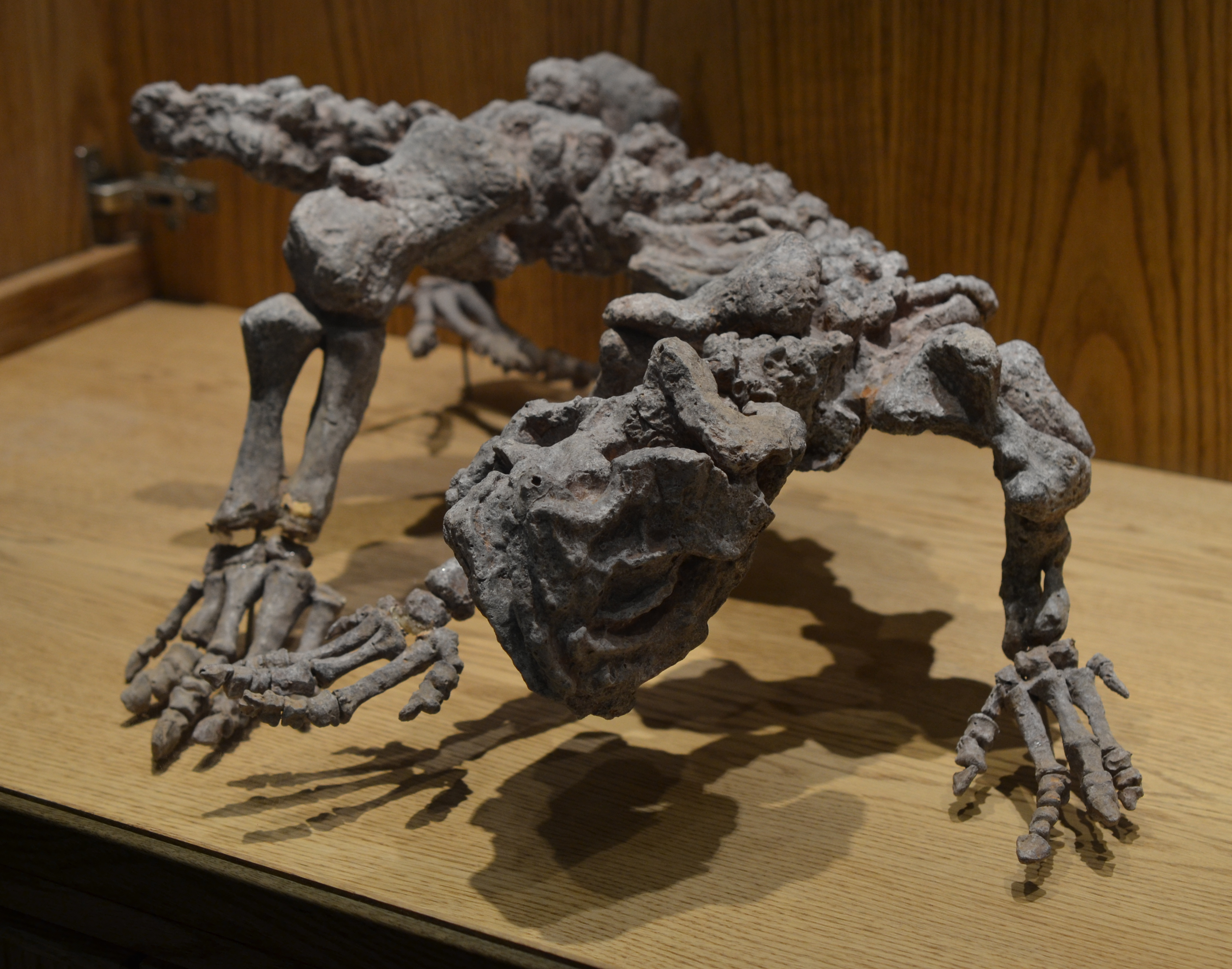
A replica Lystrosaurus on display

== See also ==
- Crooked Creek National Natural Landmark
- Paleontology in Wyoming
- Fossil Butte National Monument
