= Crooked Creek Natural Area =

National Natural Landmark in Wyoming, United States

Coordinates: 44.964°N 108.275°W

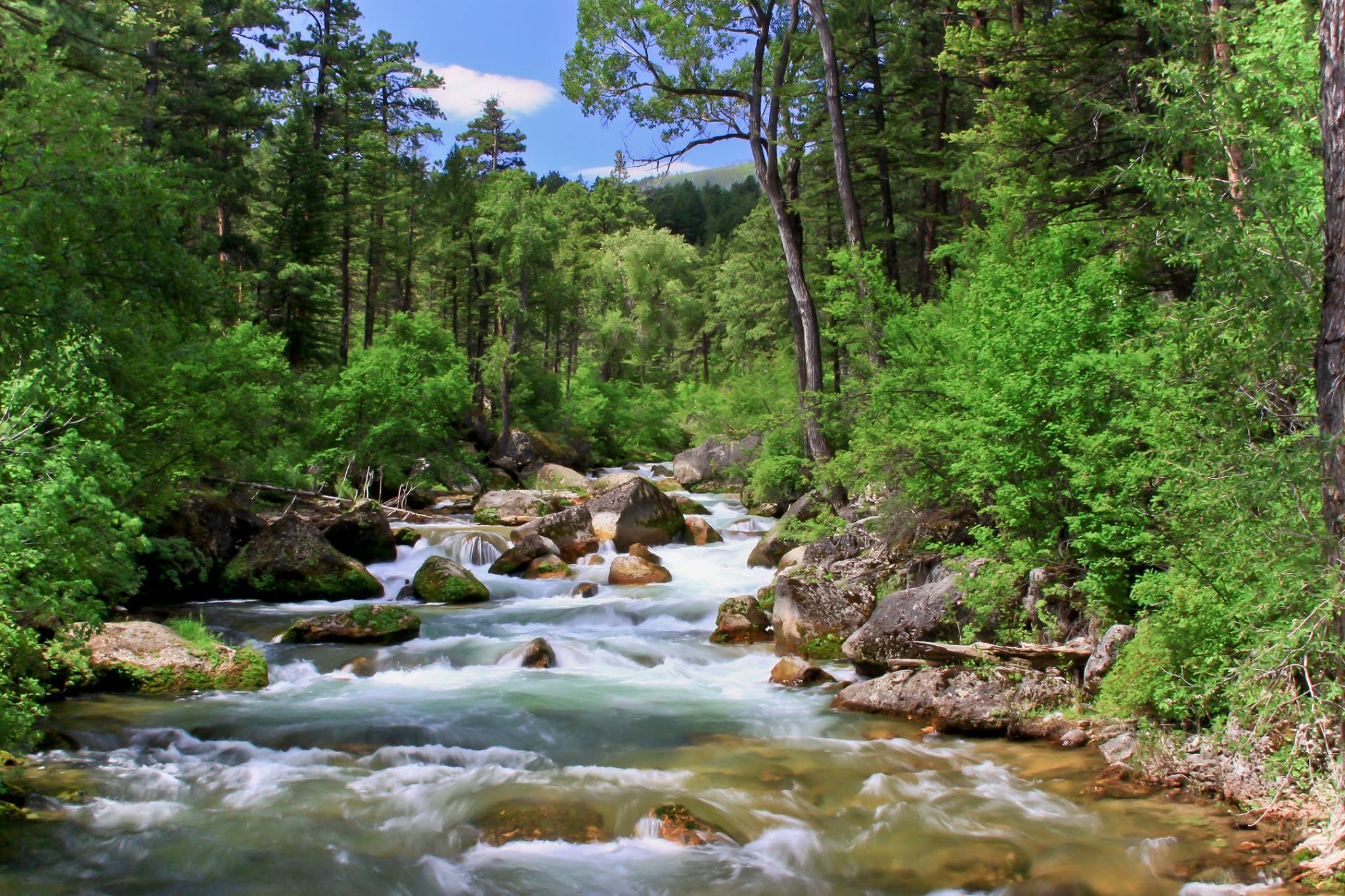

- Location within Wyoming Location within the United States
- Nearest city: Lovell, Wyoming
- Added to NRHP: 1966

Crooked Creek Natural Area is a protected fossil site in Bighorn National Forest in Big Horn County, Wyoming, known for many fossils of Early Cretaceous period. Only two other places on the North American continent cover this Early Cretaceous period. Found on the site are eight new species and three new genera of dinosaurs. The site also covers some of the Upper Jurassic of the Morrison Formation.

The Crooked Creek Natural Area is also known for its wild horses. The site had past mining activity and is now under Area of Critical Environmental Concern that is managed by the Bureau of Land Management (BLM). The southern part of the Pryor Mountains Wild Horse Range is in the Crooked Creek Natural Area.

It was designated as a National Natural Landmark in 1966. The closest city is Lovell, Wyoming, 42 miles south. To the west is Bighorn Canyon National Recreation Area.

== See also ==
- List of fossil sites (with link directory)
- Wyoming Dinosaur Center
- Paleontology in Wyoming
- Fossil Butte National Monument
