= Fossil Butte National Monument =

National monument in the United States

- IUCN category V (protected landscape/seascape)
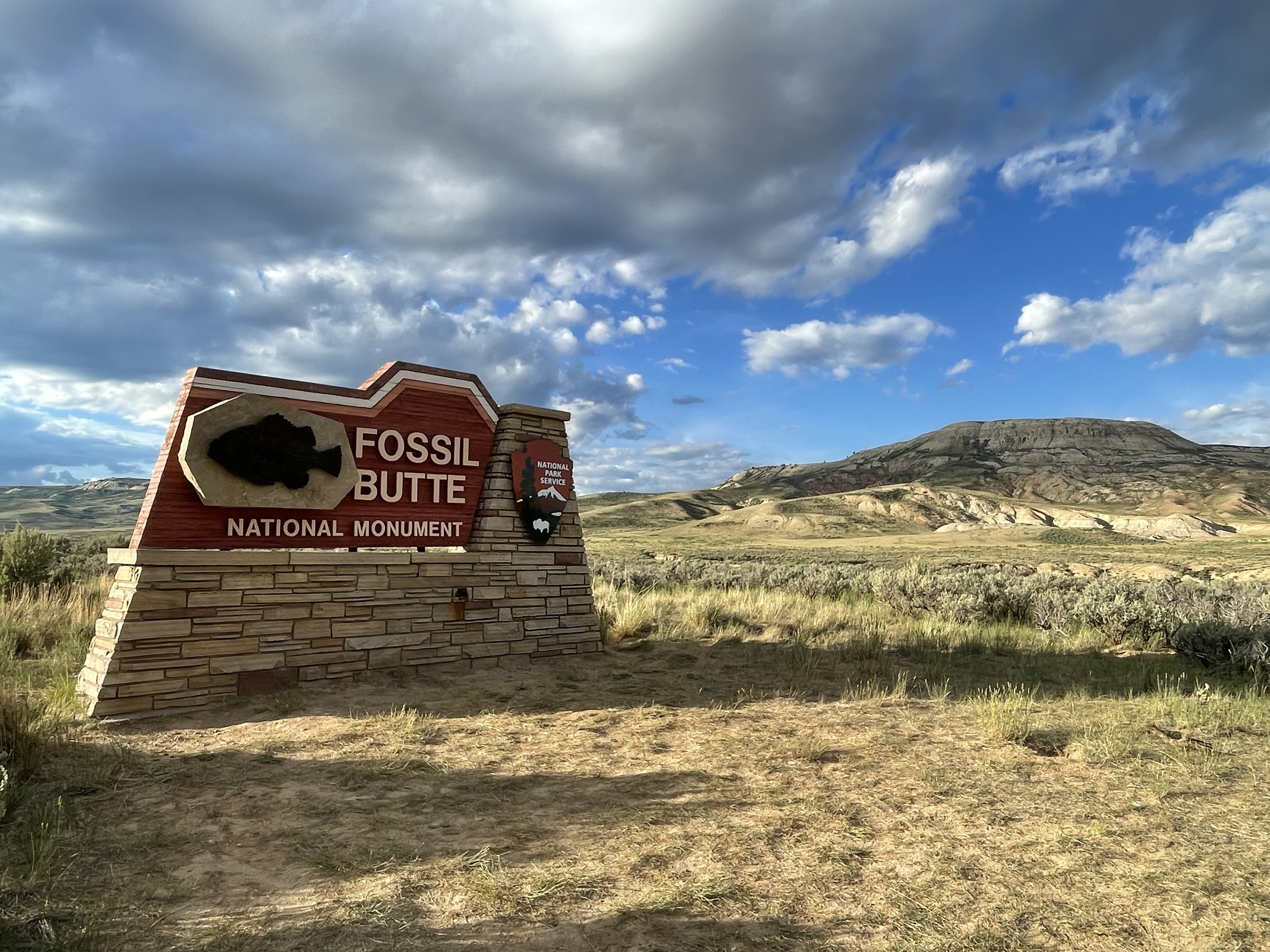
- Fossil Butte National Monument

- Location within Wyoming Location within the United States
- Interactive map of Fossil Butte National Monument
- Location: Lincoln County, Wyoming, US
- Nearest city: Kemmerer, WY
- Coordinates: 41°51′52″N 110°46′33″W
- Area: 8,198 acres (33.18 km^{2})
- Max. elevation: 7,600 feet (2,300 m)
- Min. elevation: 6,600 feet (2,000 m)
- Established: October 23, 1972
- Visitors: 20,626 (in 2025)
- Governing body: National Park Service
- Website: Fossil Butte National Monument

Fossil Butte National Monument is a United States National Monument managed by the National Park Service, located 15 miles (24 km) west of Kemmerer, Wyoming, United States. It centers on an assemblage of Eocene Epoch (56 to 34 million years ago) animal and plant fossils associated with Fossil Lake—the smallest lake of the three great lakes which were then present in what are now Wyoming, Utah, and Colorado. The other two lakes were Lake Gosiute and Lake Uinta. Fossil Butte National Monument was established as a national monument on October 23, 1972.

Fossil Butte National Monument preserves the best paleontological record of Cenozoic aquatic communities in North America and possibly the world, within the 50-million-year-old Green River Formation — the ancient lake bed. Fossils preserved include fish, alligators, bats, turtles, a dog-sized horse, insects, and many other species of plants and animals — suggest that the region was a low, subtropical, freshwater basin when the sediments accumulated, over about a 2 million-year period.

== Geologic formations ==
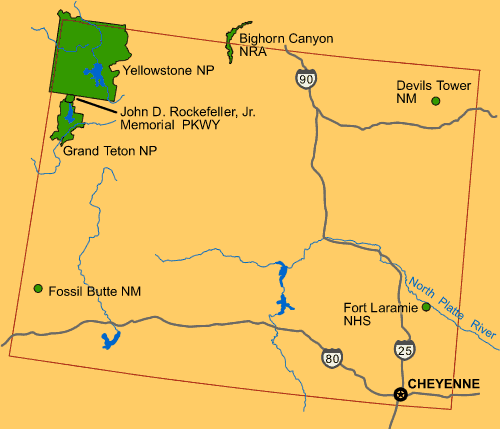
Map of major Wyoming geological formations, showing Fossil Butte (lower left) far south of Yellowstone (upper left), southwest across the state from Devils Tower (upper right).

During the Eocene this portion of Wyoming was a sub-tropical lake ecosystem. The Green River Lake System contained three ancient lakes, Fossil Lake, Lake Gosiute, and Lake Uinta. These lakes covered parts of southwest Wyoming, northeast Utah and northwestern Colorado. Fossil Butte is a remnant of the deposits from Fossil Lake. Fossil Lake was 40 to 50 miles (64 to 80 km) long from north to south and 20 miles (32 km) wide. Over the two million years that it existed, the lake varied in length and width.

Fossil Buttes National Monument contains only 13 square miles (8,198 acres (33,180,000 m^{2})) of the 900-square-mile (595,200 acres (2.409×10^{9} m^{2})) ancient lake. The ancient lake sediments that form the primary fossil digs is referred to as the Green River Formation. In addition to this fossil-bearing strata, a large portion of the Wasatch Formation, river and stream sediments, is within the national monument. The Wasatch Formation represents the shoreline ecosystem around the lake and contains fossil teeth and bone fragments of Eocene mammals. Among these are early primates and horses.

== History ==
Coal mining for the railroad led to the settlement of the nearby town of Fossil, Wyoming. When the fossils were discovered, miners dug them up to sell to collectors. In particular, Lee Craig sold fossils from 1897 to 1937. Commercial fossil collecting is not allowed within the National Monument, but numerous quarries on private land nearby continue to produce extraordinary fossil specimens, both for museums and for private collectors.

== Climate ==
Climate data for Fossil Butte, Wyoming, 1991–2020 normals, extremes 1990–present
| Month | Jan | Feb | Mar | Apr | May | Jun | Jul | Aug | Sep | Oct | Nov | Dec | Year |
|---|---|---|---|---|---|---|---|---|---|---|---|---|---|
| Record high °F (°C) | 53 (12) | 55 (13) | 69 (21) | 77 (25) | 89 (32) | 92 (33) | 109 (43) | 96 (36) | 93 (34) | 81 (27) | 67 (19) | 57 (14) | 109 (43) |
| Mean maximum °F (°C) | 41.5 (5.3) | 44.3 (6.8) | 56.3 (13.5) | 69.7 (20.9) | 78.1 (25.6) | 85.8 (29.9) | 92.3 (33.5) | 89.9 (32.2) | 84.3 (29.1) | 73.7 (23.2) | 58.2 (14.6) | 45.2 (7.3) | 92.9 (33.8) |
| Mean daily maximum °F (°C) | 27.9 (−2.3) | 30.5 (−0.8) | 41.1 (5.1) | 52.4 (11.3) | 62.9 (17.2) | 73.5 (23.1) | 83.4 (28.6) | 81.8 (27.7) | 71.7 (22.1) | 57.0 (13.9) | 40.3 (4.6) | 28.6 (−1.9) | 54.3 (12.4) |
| Daily mean °F (°C) | 16.2 (−8.8) | 18.3 (−7.6) | 28.4 (−2.0) | 37.5 (3.1) | 46.3 (7.9) | 54.4 (12.4) | 62.6 (17.0) | 61.2 (16.2) | 52.0 (11.1) | 40.1 (4.5) | 27.2 (−2.7) | 16.9 (−8.4) | 38.4 (3.6) |
| Mean daily minimum °F (°C) | 4.5 (−15.3) | 6.1 (−14.4) | 15.6 (−9.1) | 22.6 (−5.2) | 29.7 (−1.3) | 35.4 (1.9) | 41.8 (5.4) | 40.6 (4.8) | 32.2 (0.1) | 23.3 (−4.8) | 14.0 (−10.0) | 5.2 (−14.9) | 22.6 (−5.2) |
| Mean minimum °F (°C) | −20.0 (−28.9) | −17.4 (−27.4) | −5.7 (−20.9) | 10.0 (−12.2) | 17.3 (−8.2) | 24.6 (−4.1) | 31.8 (−0.1) | 29.7 (−1.3) | 19.5 (−6.9) | 7.7 (−13.5) | −7.6 (−22.0) | −18.8 (−28.2) | −26.6 (−32.6) |
| Record low °F (°C) | −38 (−39) | −33 (−36) | −22 (−30) | −8 (−22) | 8 (−13) | 13 (−11) | 25 (−4) | 21 (−6) | 10 (−12) | −24 (−31) | −23 (−31) | −45 (−43) | −45 (−43) |
| Average precipitation inches (mm) | 0.74 (19) | 0.78 (20) | 0.90 (23) | 1.09 (28) | 1.54 (39) | 1.08 (27) | 0.57 (14) | 0.91 (23) | 1.10 (28) | 1.26 (32) | 0.89 (23) | 0.86 (22) | 11.72 (298) |
| Average snowfall inches (cm) | 14.4 (37) | 12.7 (32) | 11.4 (29) | 6.1 (15) | 2.1 (5.3) | 0.3 (0.76) | 0.0 (0.0) | 0.0 (0.0) | 0.3 (0.76) | 3.7 (9.4) | 10.0 (25) | 15.5 (39) | 76.5 (193.22) |
| Average precipitation days (≥ 0.01 in) | 8.5 | 8.3 | 7.8 | 7.7 | 9.9 | 7.0 | 5.1 | 6.8 | 6.9 | 7.4 | 8.2 | 9.3 | 92.9 |
| Average snowy days (≥ 0.1 in) | 9.9 | 8.6 | 7.6 | 4.9 | 1.9 | 0.2 | 0.0 | 0.0 | 0.2 | 2.4 | 6.5 | 9.8 | 52.0 |
Source 1: NOAA
Source 2: National Weather Service

== Exhibits ==
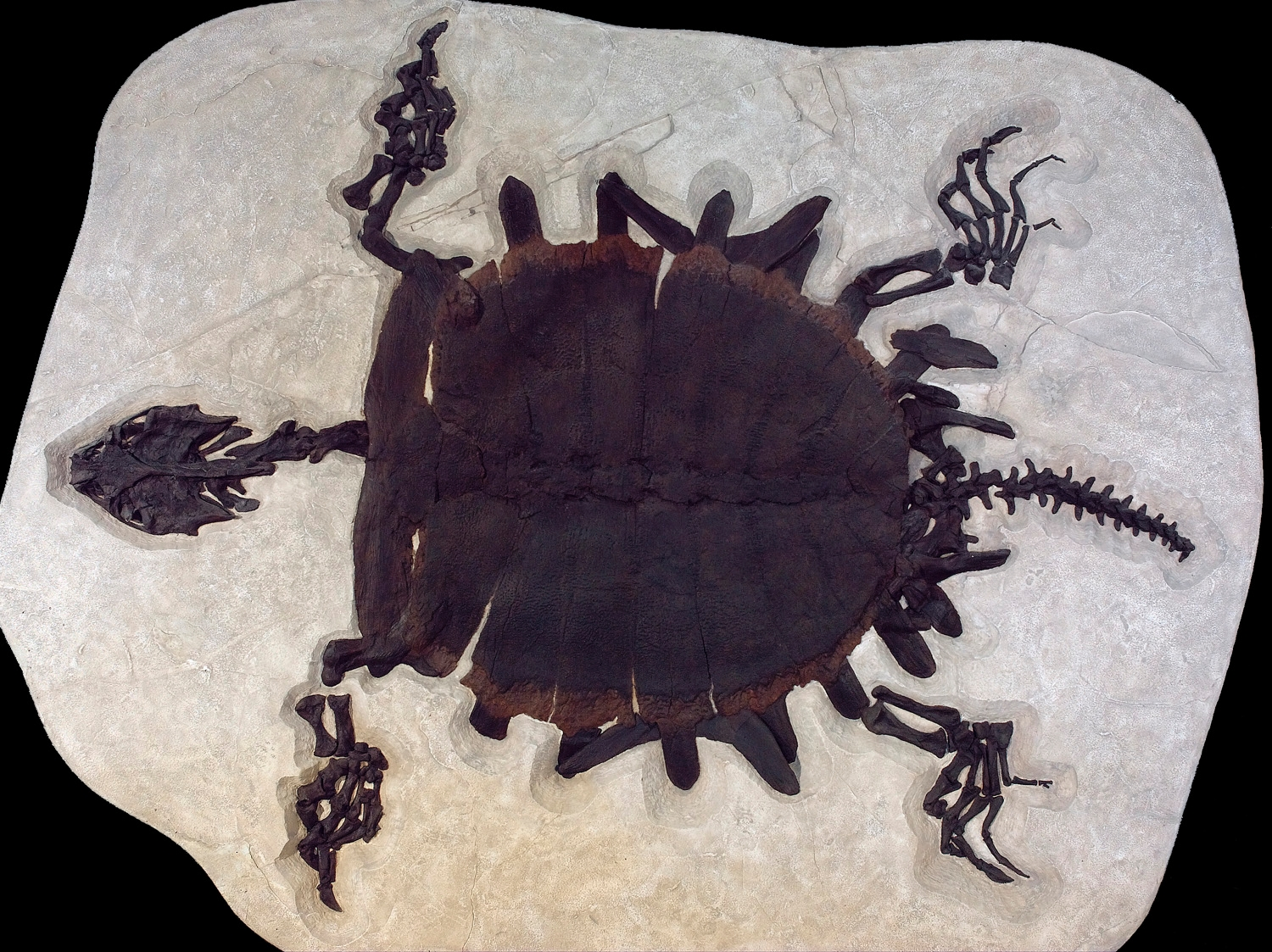
This 1.7-meter (5 foot 6 inch) Axestemys byssinus is one of the largest turtles known from Fossil Lake.

The Fossil Butte National Monument Visitor Center features over 80 fossils and fossil casts on exhibit, including fish, a crocodile, turtle, bats, birds, insects and plants. A 13-minute video is shown about the fossils found at the site and what scientists have learned. Interactive exhibits let visitors create fossil rubbings to take home, and a computer program discusses fossils, geology and the current natural history of the monument.

== Activities ==
During the summer, lab personnel prepare fossils in public. Summer activities also include ranger programs, hikes, paleontology and geology talks, and participation in fossil quarry collections for the park.

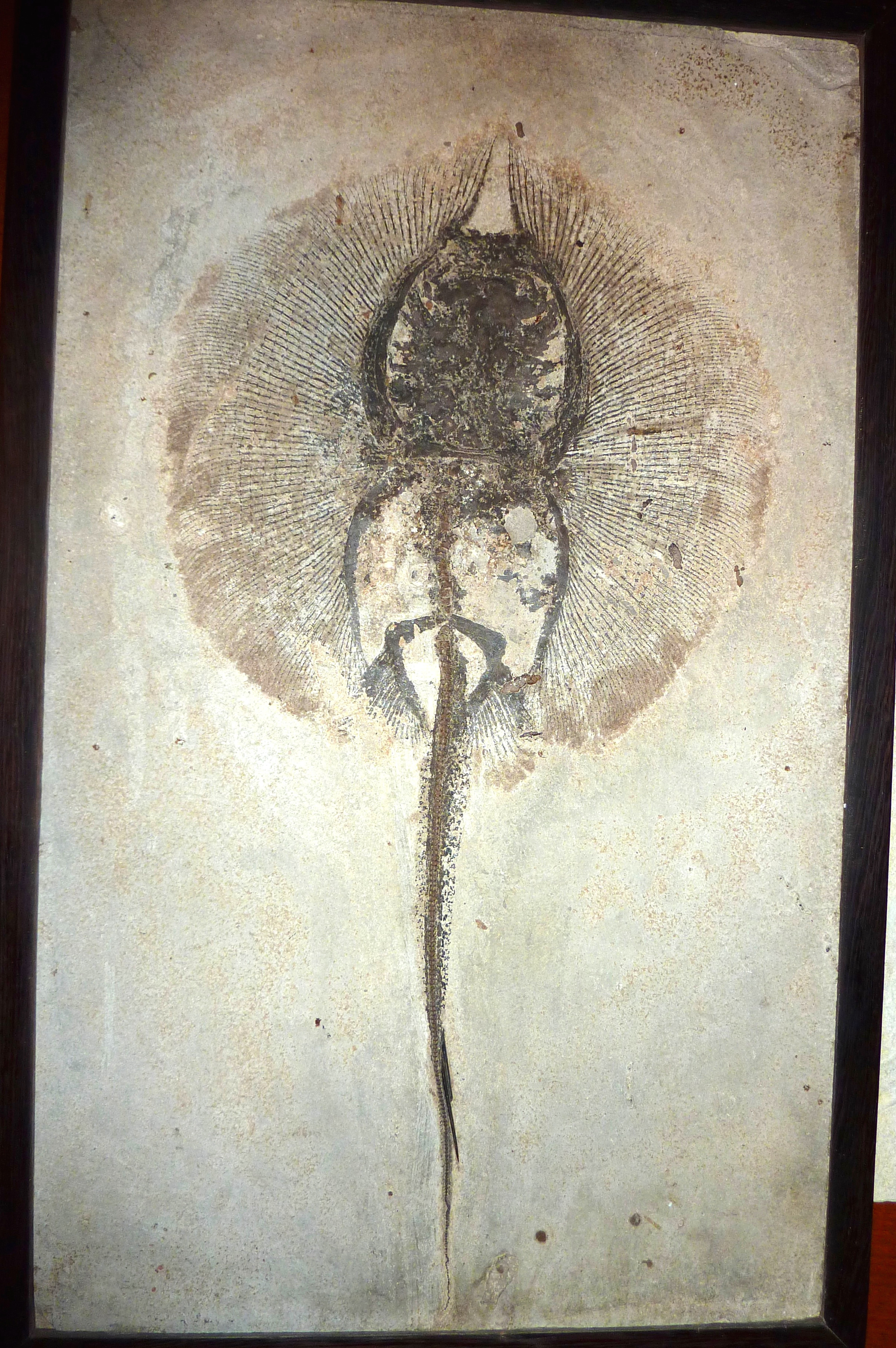
Stingray prepared by R. Lee Craig (Asterotrygon maloneyi). In the collection of Fossil Shack. Prepared circa 1920.

A Junior Ranger program can be completed by children aged 5–12 (with exercises scaled to the child's age) in 3–4 hours. A highlight is hiking 3/4 mile up the butte to the dig, where interns from the Geological Society of America talk about their excavation and let children help them flake apart sedimentary deposits to discover fish fossils and coprolites.

== List of fossil species recovered at Fossil Butte National Monument ==
Fish:

- Asterotrygon spp, an extinct stingray
- Diplomystus dentatus, an extinct ray-finned fish
- Knightia spp, an extinct fish related to herring and sardines
- Seven extinct species of perch
- Heliobatis radians, an extinct stingray
- Notogoneus spp, an extinct bottom-feeding fish
- Crossopholis magnicaudatus (Commons), a 1-meter (40 inches) long predatory paddlefish
- Asineops squamifrons, called 'mystery fish'- allocated its own family Asineopidae
- Two extinct species of the family Osteoglossidae
- Amphiplaga brachyptera, an extinct freshwater fish
- Two extinct species of the genus Hiodon

Amphibians:

- Aleoamphiuma tetradactylum, an extinct omnivorous salamander
- Aerugoamnis paulus, an extinct frog

Mammals:

- Coryphodon
- Onychonycteris finneyi and Icaronycteris index, bats
- Heptodon, an extinct tapir
- Apatemys chardini, a tree-dwelling mammal similar to the lemur
- Protorohippus, an early horse-like mammal
- Palaeosinopa didelphoides, an otter-like carnivore
- Hyopsodus wortmani 'tube sheep', a small omnivore
- L. popoagicum, an extinct odd-toed ungulate

Birds:

- Frigate birds
- Pseudocrypturus cercanaxius, an extinct shoreline bird
- Gallinuloides wyomingesis, an extinct land fowl
- Primobucco mcgrewi, an extinct roller bird
- Four extinct species of parrot- Cyrillavis coldurnorum, Cyrillavis olsoni, Avolatavis tenens and Tynskya eocaena

Reptiles:

- Afairiguana, an extinct anole
- Boavus idelmani, a small extinct snake
- Bahndwivici, Afairiguana avius and Bahndwivici ammoskius, extinct lizards
- Baptemys wyomingenis, an extinct river turtle
- Echmatemys wyomingensis, an extinct pond turtle
- Borealosuchus wilsoni and Tsoabichi greenriverenis, extinct crocodiles
- Three species of soft-shell turtles- Apalone heteroglypta, Axestemys byssinus and Hummelichelys guttata
- Baenidae, turtle

Plants:

- Palm trees
- Cattails
- Gyrocarpus spp
- Lagokarpos Lacustris, a type of distinct 'winged fruit' plant Lagokarpos found in lake deposits
- Ailanthus confucii
- Platycerium, a staghorn fern
- Salvinia preauriculata, a water fern
- Lygodium kaulfussi 'climbing fern'
- Nelumbo spp
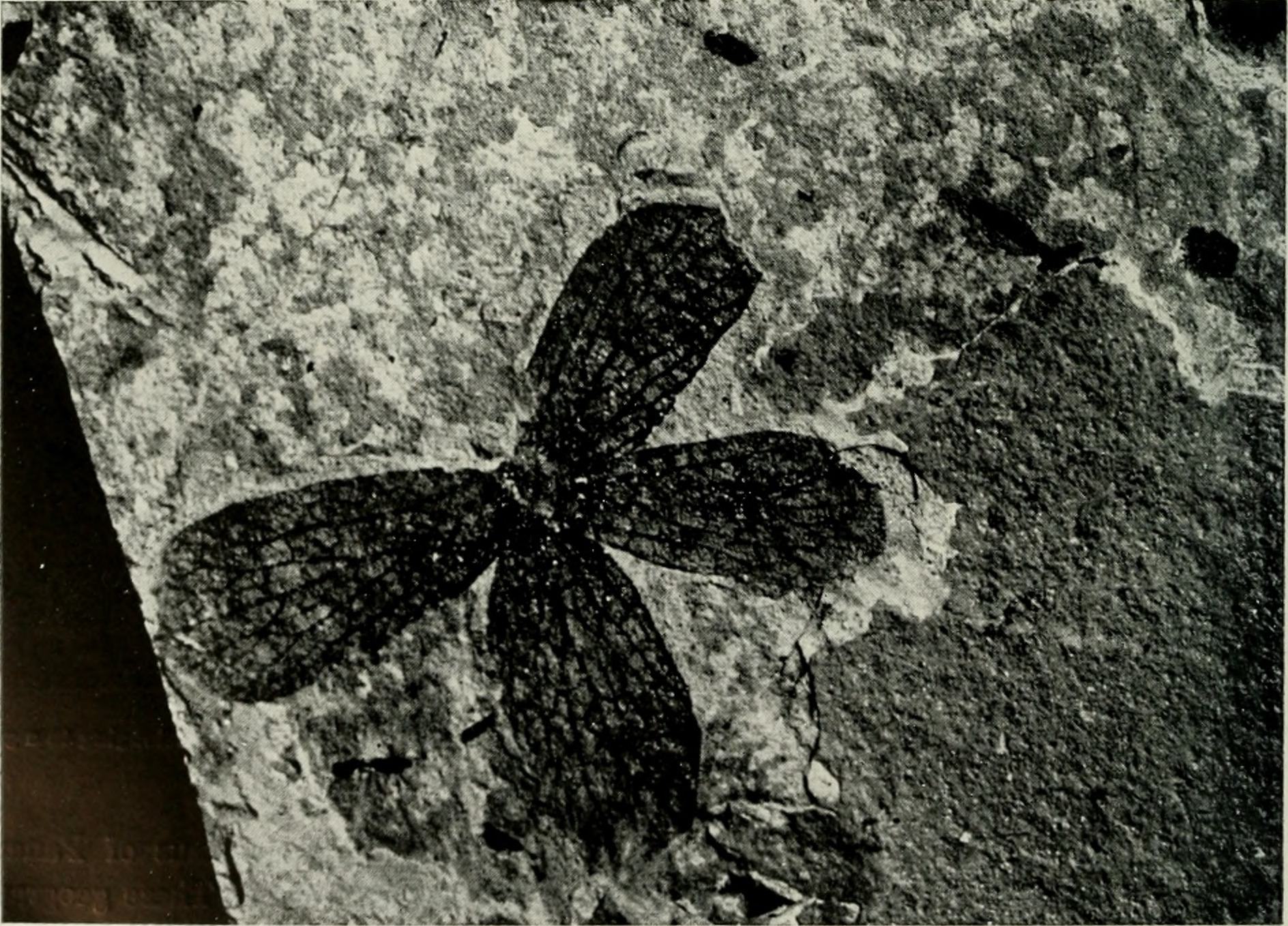
- †Chaneya tenuis
  Chaneya tenuis; a genus of uncertain affinities
- Birthwort (species unknown)
- Soapberry
- Species similar to a walnut

Arthropods:

- Bechleja rostrata, an extinct species of shrimp
- Procambarus primaevus, an extinct species of crayfish
- Three unidentified species of spider
- Dragonflies
- Damselflies
- Crickets
- Other insects including bees and ants

Primary source:

== Gallery ==
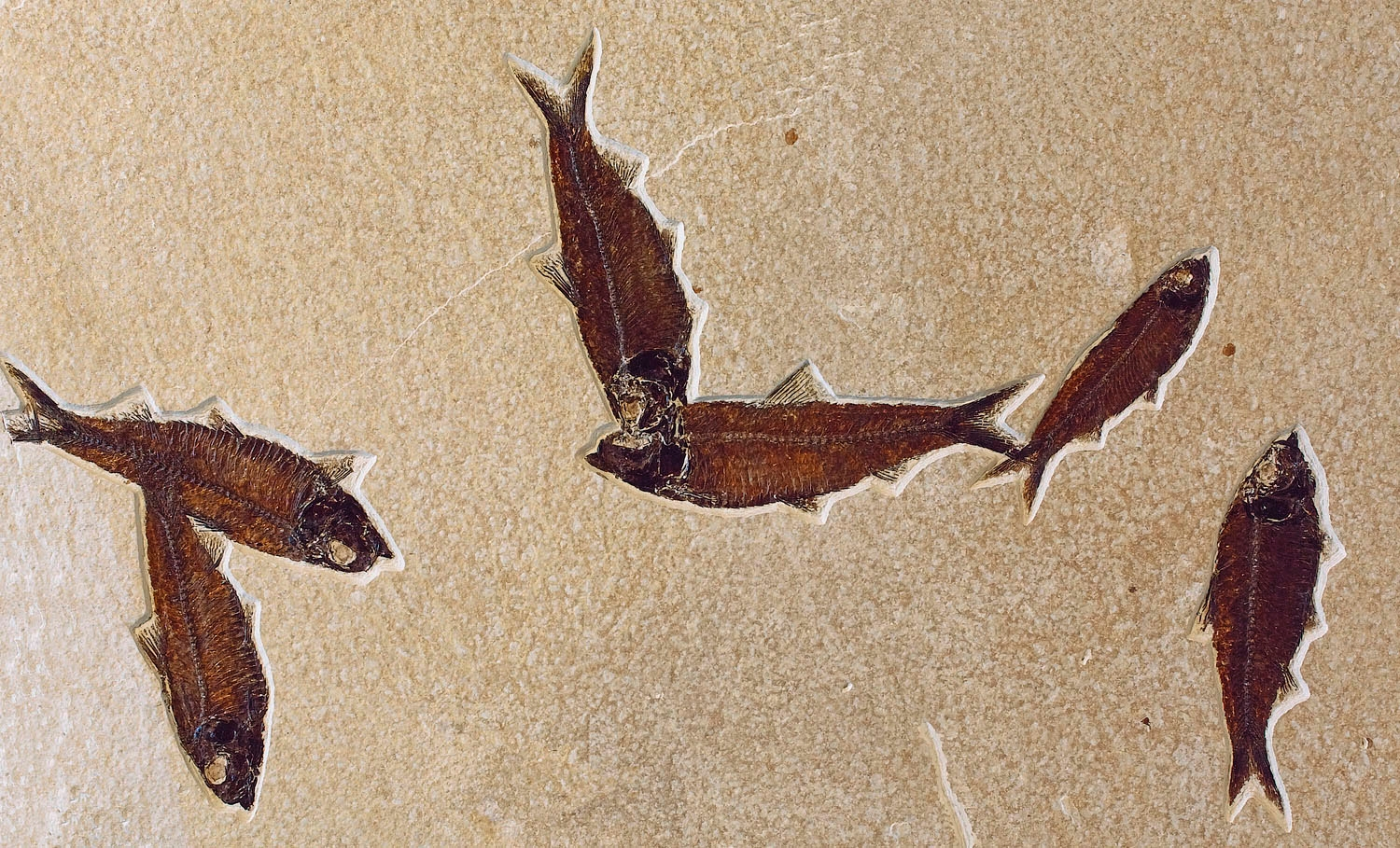
Knightia eocaena fish, about 10 centimetres (3.9 in) long. Knightia is the most commonly excavated fossil fish in the world.

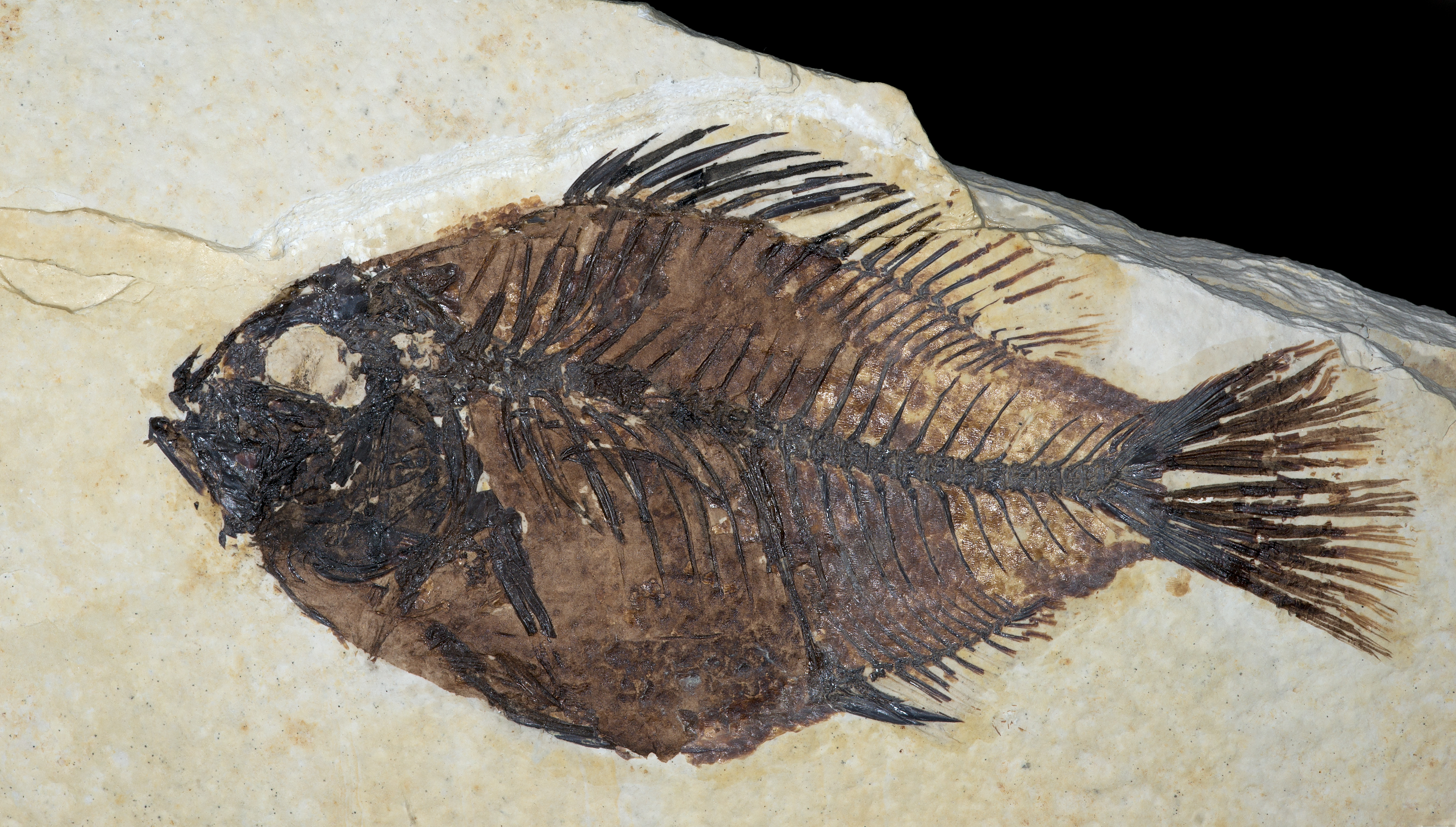
Cockerellites liops from Fossil Lake. An extinct perch. About 11.5 centimetres (4.5 in) long.

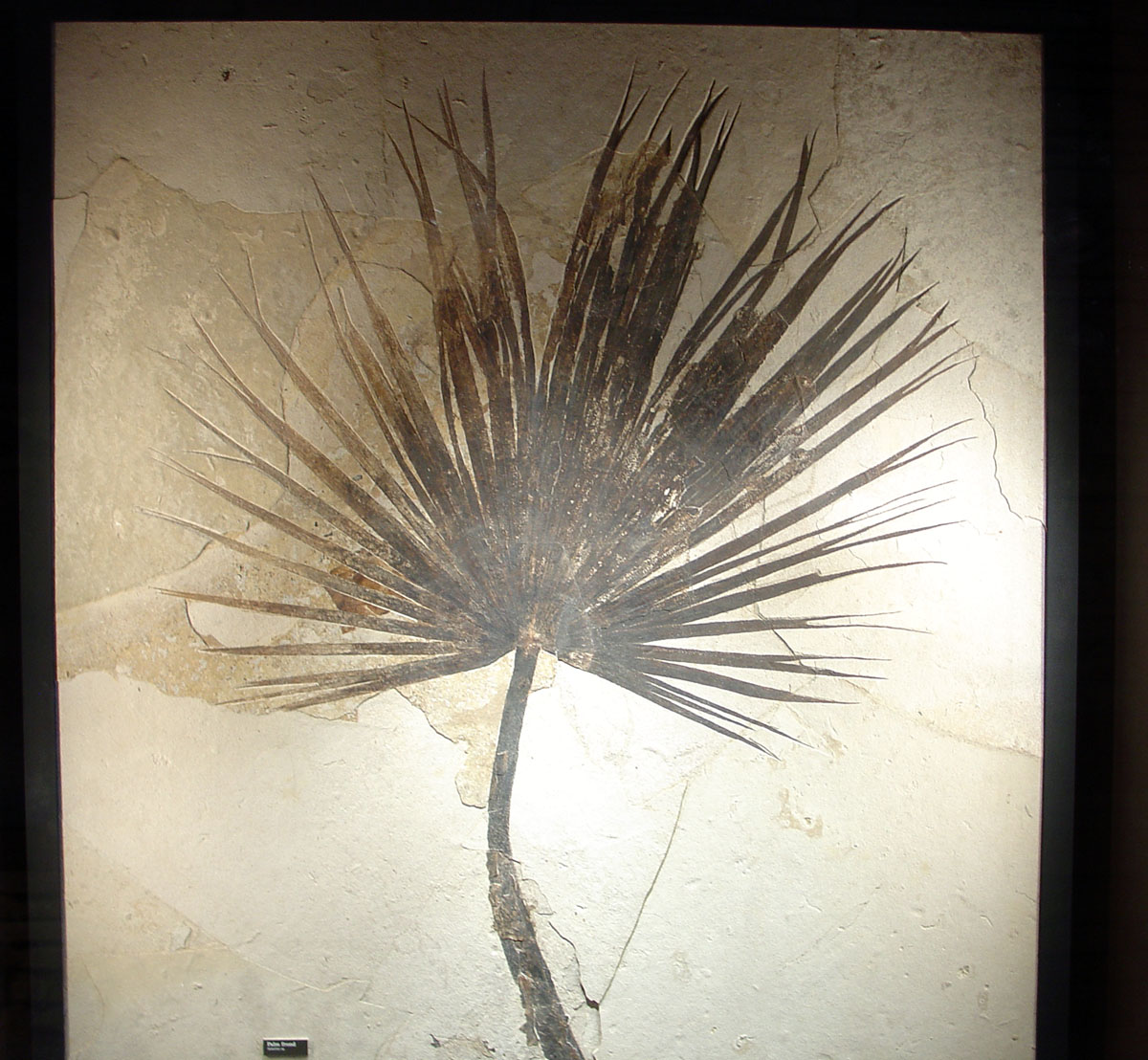
Fossil Sabalites sp. palmetto frond, about two metres (6.6 ft) long.

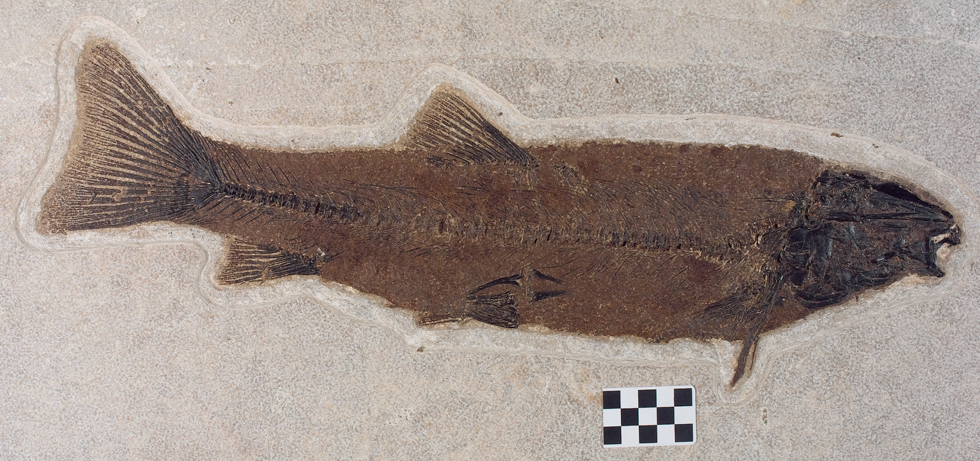
Notogoneus osculus, a 53-centimetre-long (21 in) bottom-dwelling fish from Fossil Lake.

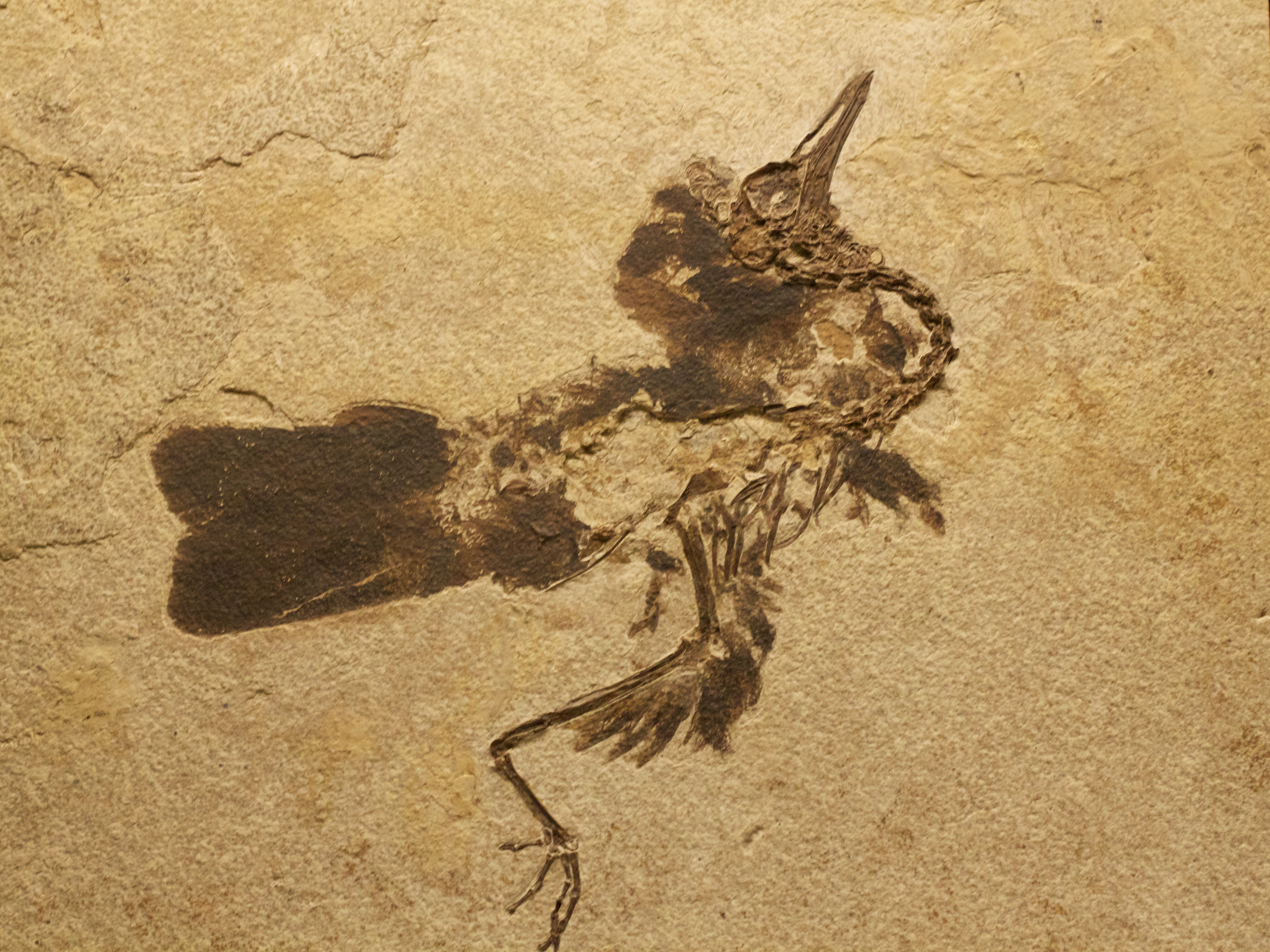
An unidentified fossil bird from FBNM, in the collections of the Field Museum

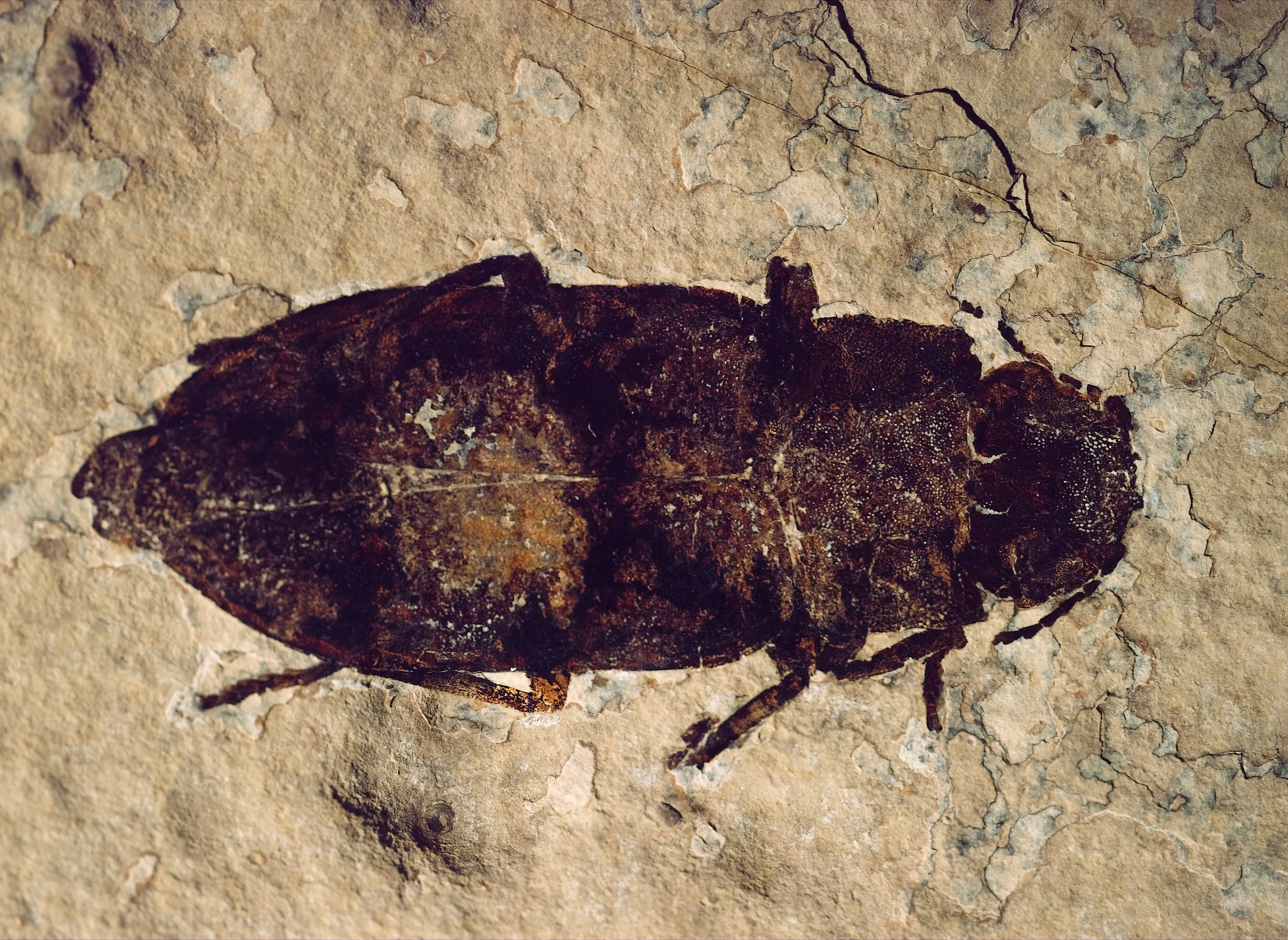
A well-preserved Buprestidae beetle (3.5 cm or 1.4 in long) from the FBNM collections. Other beetles, flies and Hemiptera bugs have also been found in the Fossil Lake sediments.

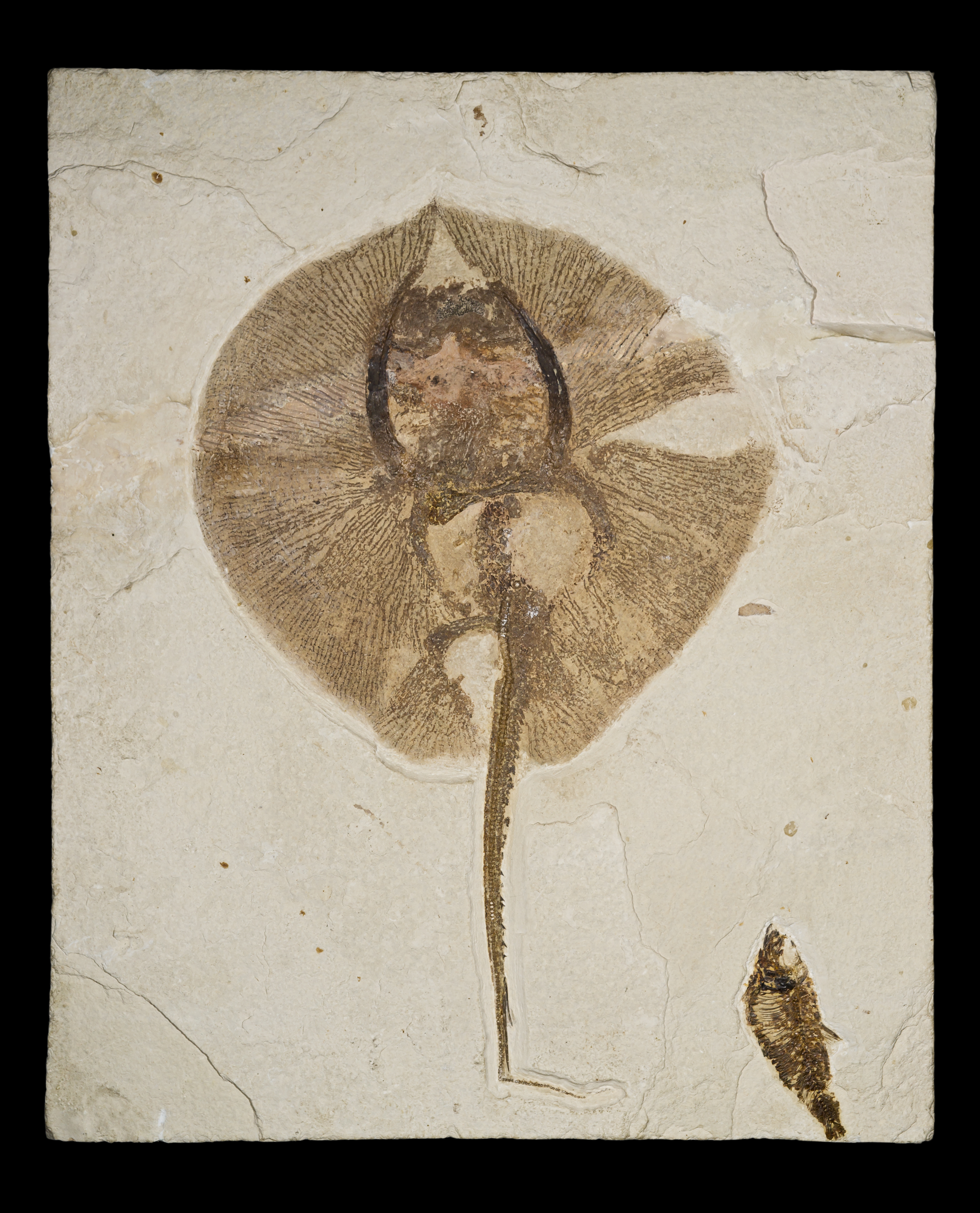
Heliobatis radians, an extinct stingray, had small teeth for crushing snails and other mollusks and barbed spines on the tail for defense. This specimen is about 35 centimetres (14 in) long, including the tail.

== See also ==
- Crooked Creek National Natural Landmark
- Wyoming Dinosaur Center
- Paleontology in Wyoming
- Dinosaur National Monument, Colorado, Utah
- List of national monuments of the United States

Other NPS Cenozoic Era sites in the western U.S.:

- John Day Fossil Beds National Monument, Oregon
- Hagerman Fossil Beds National Monument, Idaho
- Agate Fossil Beds National Monument, Nebraska
- Badlands National Park, South Dakota
- Florissant Fossil Beds National Monument, Colorado
