= Merkurosaurus =

Merkurosaurus Temporal range: Late Oligocene-Early Miocene, 28.4–15.97 Ma

Scientific classification
- Domain: Eukaryota
- Kingdom: Animalia
- Phylum: Chordata
- Class: Reptilia
- Order: Squamata
- Genus: †Merkurosaurus; Klembara, 2008
- Species: †M. ornatus

Binomial name
- †Merkurosaurus ornatus Klembara, 2008

Extinct genus of lizards

Merkurosaurus is an extinct genus of lizards from the Shinisauria that is known from the Late Oligocene of Germany, collected in 1999, and the Early Miocene Most Formation of the Czech Republic (west Bohemia) and the Wiesbaden Formation Germany of (Amöneburg). A single species, Merkurosaurus ornatus, is known and was named and described by Jozef Klembara in 2008 based on the holotype Pb 02045 and other referred specimens. It was initially only known from deposits in the Czech Republic but remains found in Germany were eventually attributed to the genus in 2015.
