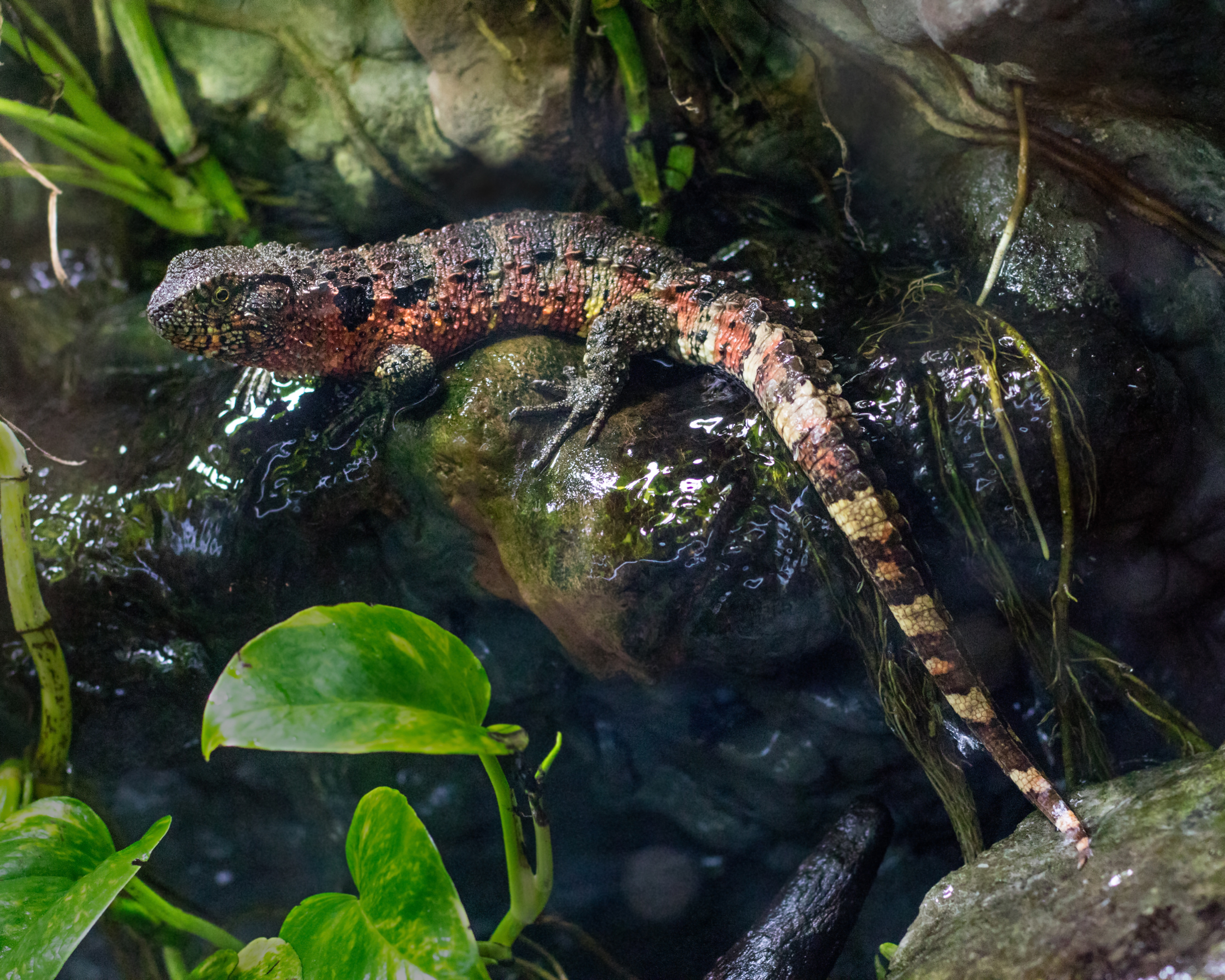
- At the Newport Aquarium in Newport, Kentucky

Conservation status
- Endangered (IUCN 3.1)
- CITES Appendix II

Scientific classification
- Kingdom: Animalia
- Phylum: Chordata
- Class: Reptilia
- Order: Squamata
- Suborder: Anguimorpha
- Clade: Shinisauria
- Superfamily: Shinisauroidea; Vidal & Hedges, 2009
- Family: Shinisauridae; Ahl, 1930
- Genus: Shinisaurus; Ahl, 1930
- Species: S. crocodilurus

Binomial name
- Shinisaurus crocodilurus Ahl, 1930

= Chinese crocodile lizard =

Species of lizard

The Chinese crocodile lizard (Shinisaurus crocodilurus) is a semiaquatic anguimorph lizard found only in cool forests in southeastern China and northeastern Vietnam. The Chinese crocodile lizard spends much of its time in shallow water or in overhanging branches and vegetation, where it hunts its prey of insects, snails, tadpoles, and worms. Individuals in captivity may be fed baby mice. A rare and little-studied lizard, it is listed in CITES Appendix II, which regulates international trade of specimens. The Chinese crocodile lizard is the only member of the monotypic superfamily Shinisauroidea and the sole extant species in Shinisauria, a clade of lizards whose fossil record extends back to the Early Cretaceous, over 120 million years ago.

== Description ==
=== Anatomy ===
Chinese crocodile lizards are characterized by their green, colored with reddish necks. They often have alternating bands of light and dark patterns. Male Chinese crocodile lizards are more common than females, especially during the breeding season. On average, these lizards are 40–46 cm (16–18 in) long. Perhaps the lizards' most distinctive features are the rows of bony scales down its back and muscular tail, imitating those of a crocodile. Additionally, Chinese crocodile lizards are sexually dimorphic and can be distinguished visually. Adult males are larger and more colorful than females, with their color intensifying during the breeding season.

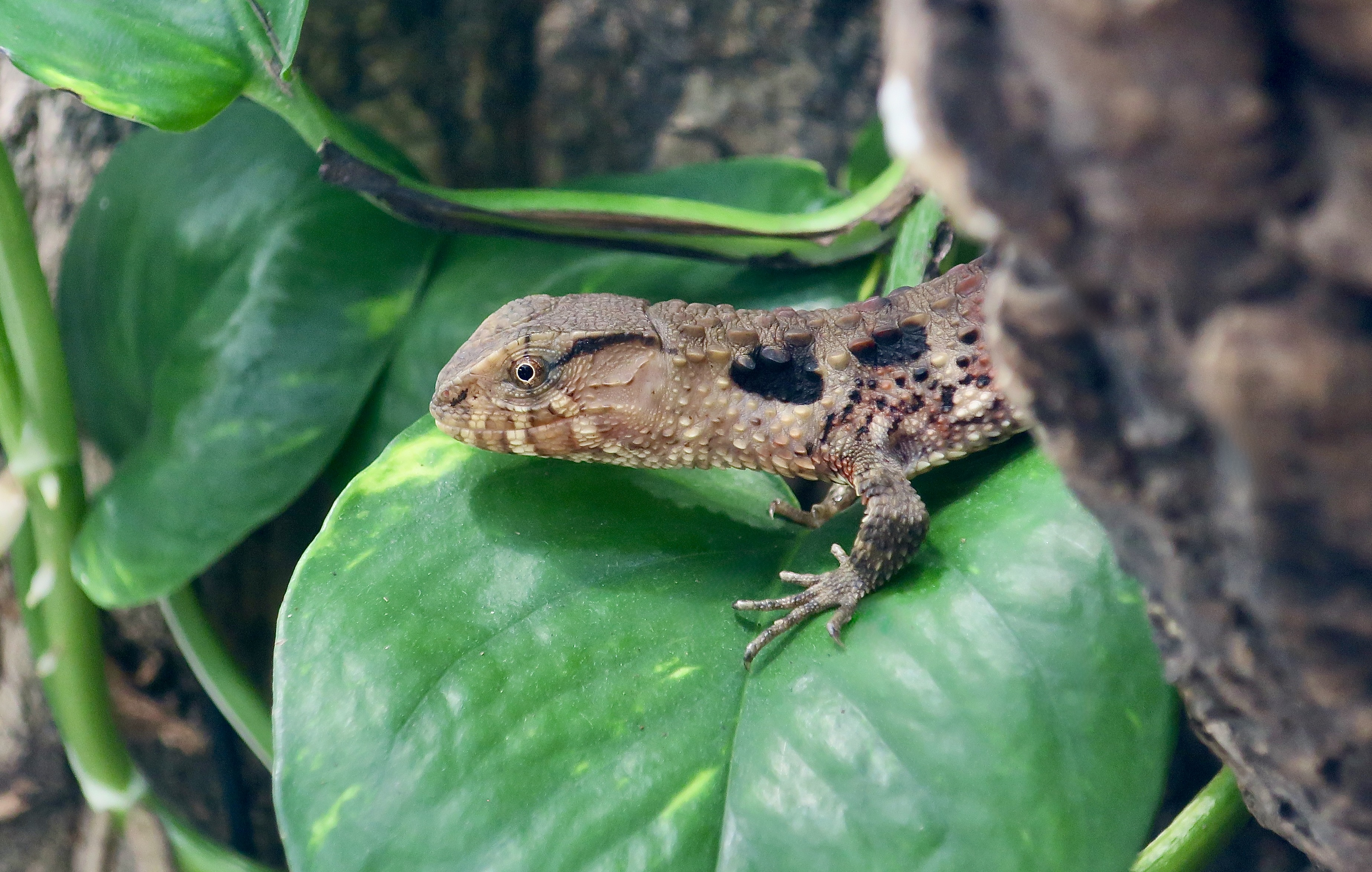
A juvenile at The Gecko Gallery, New York City

=== Gut microbes ===
The composition of gut microbiota is associated with the lizard's metabolism and health. For the Chinese crocodile lizard (as an endangered species), the gut microbiota is an area of concerned study and interest; greater understanding of their diet and dietary functions help contribute to a more stable international, and (ultimately) wild, population. With Chinese crocodile lizards of different ages, there are minimal differences between the adult and juvenile lizards' gut microbial composition; the young will typically seek out the smallest invertebrates they can find, from larvae and young of beetles to spiders, small flies and ants. For mature animals, the crocodile lizards consume prey opportunistically, from earthworms, centipedes, millipedes, and beetles to the larvae from Lepidoptera. Female crocodile lizards have a preference for larval beetles and earthworms, especially during breeding seasons. Within the gut microbiota population, Bacillota and Pseudomonadota are the main microbiota found in the Shinisaurus crocodilurus. These two gut microbes are important across vertebrates and, for crocodile lizards, it benefits and aids in the species' metabolism, environmental information processing, genetic information processing and cellular processing.

== Behavior ==
=== Diet ===
In China, Shinisaurus crocodilurus is known to feed on both vertebrates and invertebrates. They are "sit-and-wait" predators, perched on branches near streams until prey items are sighted. Invertebrates include both terrestrial groups (worms, spiders, katydids, etc.) and aquatic shrimp. Vertebrate prey includes tadpoles, small fish, and occasionally frogs and lizards. The Vietnamese subspecies prefers terrestrial invertebrates, such as cockroaches, crickets, and particularly earthworms. Vertebrates are not known to be part of their diet.

=== Territorial behavior ===
Shinisaurus crocodilurus have been observed to be territorial and in a given pond or stream, one sole lizard will occupy the entire space. They will widen their mouths to establish dominance, which is known as gaping. The frequency of which Shinisaurus crocodilurus gape is thought to establish a dominant-subordinate social structure to their conspecifics. Similar to other lizards like Dipsosaurus dorsalis or Tropidurus spp., the Chinese crocodile lizards would also swing their tails and lunge at their competitors. The dominant lizard will lunge and whip its tail, without force, at the subordinate lizard. The result of this is often little to no physical harm done to the subordinate. However, the subordinate lizard will retreat from the dominant's territory. Another interesting dominance-establishing behavior for Shinisaurus crocodilurus is push-up behavior. The lizard would straighten its forelimbs and level the head. Unlike other lizards, the Shinisaurus crocodilurus would only perform this push-up motion with its anterior portion. While they were doing push-ups, Shinisaurus crocodilurus would sometimes bob their head in a circular motion.

=== Reproduction ===
On average, Shinisaurus crocodilurus are fully mature and able to reproduce by the age of 3. They are viviparous lizards, giving birth to 2-12 fully developed offspring every spring. The gestation period lasts for up to 9 months. This means that the mother does not have to take care of their offspring and that the offspring can survive independently. Female crocodile lizards are able to breed annually. Courtship often begins at the end of winter and breeding often occurs in the summer season, mainly July and August.

Pre-copulation for the Shinisaurus crocodilurus often begins with the adult male appearance changing to a more vibrant coloration. Adult male lizards will display courtship behaviors like head-nodding and approaching the females. Successful copulation for the Shinisaurus crocodilurus is when the adult male approaches to bite the female adult on the neck. He then will move his body position to be on top of the female's and secure his tail below the female. This position is observed to be securing the position of the adult female to male contact with the cloaca. After ejaculation, the adult male will release the neck bite and physically release the female.

== Distribution and habitat ==
Surviving subpopulations of Chinese crocodile lizards primarily occupy isolated fragments of land in Guangxi and Guangdong provinces of southeastern China. The Vietnamese subspecies is only found on Yên Tử Mountain in Quảng Ninh and Bac Giang provinces of northeastern Vietnam. Shinisaurus crocodilurus live alongside clear streams within subtropical broadleaf evergreen forests. They have a habitual preference for remote streams in undisturbed areas such as mountain ridges and dense forests. The species lives in a relatively cool, monsoonal climate at moderately high elevations, 200–1,500 meters (660–4,920 ft) above sea level. Their preference to occupy less dense habitat is in-line with their antipredator trajectory towards flight rather than fight. Shinisaurus crocodilurus utilize tree holes, rocks, vegetated perches as shelter and are rarely found exposed on the forest floor.

== Taxonomy ==
Shinisaurus (literally "Shin's lizard") honors the biologist Sin Shu-szi (Chinese: 辛树帜; pinyin: Xīn Shùzhì), a member of a joint Chinese-German expedition that discovered this species (as well as the frog Quasipaa shini). Its specific name – like the separate genus Crocodilurus – means "crocodile-tail".

=== Subspecies ===
Two subspecies are recognized:

- Shinisaurus crocodilurus crocodilurus Ahl, 1930 (southeast China)
- Shinisaurus crocodilurus vietnamensis Schingen et al., 2016 – Vietnamese crocodile lizard (northeast Vietnam)

A subpopulation of Shinisaurus crocodilurus was first described from Vietnam in 2003. They were named as a new subspecies (S. crocodilurus vietnamensis) in 2016, in light of several ecological, genetic, and morphological distinctions relative to the Chinese subpopulations. The Vietnamese subspecies preferred granitic mountains with warmer winters and overall milder temperatures. They tended to perch on higher branches above streams which were wider, more active, and not completely covered by vegetation. The diet was primarily terrestrial invertebrates, rather than aquatic vertebrates. In general, the head was slightly longer and more pointed, with smaller eyes and a shallower cheek region.

Variation within the Chinese subspecies is poorly-understood. Genetic studies of captive individuals indicate that Shinisaurus crocodilurus is split into four clades, three of which originated in China and one of which corresponds to the Vietnamese subspecies. However, wild individuals and local breeding programs in China appear show low genetic diversity between subpopulations.

=== Classification ===
Shinisaurus was once also regarded as a member of Xenosauridae, but most recent studies of the evolutionary relationships of anguimorphs consider Shinisaurus to be more closely related to monitor lizards and helodermatids than to Xenosaurus. It is now placed as the only living member of the clade Shinisauria within the Anguimorpha. Although Shinisaurus is closely related to helodermatids, venomous, a 2023 proteomic analysis of the mandibular glands of S.crocodilurus found no toxinrelated proteins, indicating that the Chinese crocodile lizard itself is not venomous. The fossil record of Shinisauria extends back to the Early Cretaceous, over 120 million years ago, with fossils being known from Asia, Europe and North America. In 2026, paleontologists described Acutodon villeveyracensis from the Late Cretaceous of southern France, identified as the oldest known European pan-shinisaur and extending the group's European fossil record by around 30 million years.

== Conservation ==
=== Population dynamics ===
A 2008 study, based on a 2004 survey, estimated that 950 crocodile lizards were left in China, split into eight isolated subpopulations. The largest subpopulation, with around 350 individuals, represents 36% of the entire population in China. A 1978 survey estimated the presence of 6,000 individuals, while a 1990 survey estimated around 2,500 individuals in the entirety of China. This points to severe population decline, on the order of 70-90% per subpopulation, in the 1978–2004 period. Five subpopulations appear to have been extirpated, including the only sites known from Hunan province. The smallest surviving subpopulations are likely unsustainable due to a lack of genetic diversity. A 2013 survey estimated that around 60 adults were left in Vietnam. Despite the discovery of an additional subpopulation near the border with China, the estimated adult population in Vietnam decreased to 41 by 2015. The rate of decline in Vietnam is nearly equivalent to 26 years in China.

=== Threats ===
In 2014, Shinisaurus crocodilurus was listed as endangered on the IUCN Red List. Subpopulations are fragmented and restricted by specific habitat requirements, which make repopulation difficult. The majority of individuals, including the largest subpopulation, occur outside of protected areas. Habitat loss is a major threat, with Chinese populations particularly impacted by logging. Removal of broadleaf evergreen foliage makes streams more volatile, leading to flooding and drying cycles which are unsuitable for the lizards. Other sources of habitat loss include mining pollution, small-scale farming, and dam construction leading to water flow changes. Environmentally destructive fishing styles, such as electrofishing and poisoning, contribute to stream degradation. Another prominent threat is poaching for the pet trade, meat, and traditional Chinese medicine as a claimed cure for insomnia. In Vietnam, the local subspecies is impacted by similar threats, as well as road construction and coal mining. Local tourism has also led to habitat loss and stream pollution. Habitat loss will be amplified by climate change: one model argues that forest habitats with a climate suitable for the Chinese subspecies will be eliminated by 2080.

The species was introduced into the international pet trade in the 1980s, with exports increasing to several hundred per year by the late 1980s. Population decline linked to increasing exports led to the species being listed on CITES Appendix II in 1990. In 1990, export listings abruptly shifted to the claim that sold individuals were captive bred. However, most exported specimens were likely illegally harvested, as the number of exports has sharply increased with demand despite a lack of evidence for breeding facilities among sellers. The relative number of observed adults in the Vietnamese population sharply declined from 2013 to 2015, even as new sites were discovered. This trend is consistent with illegal collection, as the Vietnamese subspecies was introduced into the pet trade around the same time. In some cases, the number of traded animals approaches or exceeds the wild population estimate, suggesting the presence of undiscovered subpopulations known only to collectors. The sedentary lifestyle of the lizards eases collection, and poaching by local citizens is further incentivized by lucrative selling prices offered by dealers. The striking appearance of Shinisaurus crocodilurus has fueled the interest of reptile hobbyists in Europe and North America, though most captive individuals are slow to mature and did not live long before knowledge on their care was widely known. In 2017, the species was transferred to CITES Appendix I, according to its ongoing threat of extinction enhanced by poaching and trade.

=== Conservation measures ===
In China, subpopulations within nature reserves benefit from habitat preservation measures. Closely monitored breeding programs have been set up in Daguishan and Luokeng nature reserves, in the hopes of eventual reintroduction to other protected areas. The breeding program at Daguishan appears to have the only stable subpopulation in the country. Although the species has been listed as a protected species in China since 1989, hunting and trading laws are generally unenforced, especially outside of protected areas. Chinese crocodile lizards are well-represented in zoos throughout Europe and North America, though large populations of captive individuals are only found in the Philadelphia Zoo and Zoo Dresden.

The Vietnamese subspecies is entirely located within protected areas, but mining and tourism are poorly regulated. Brochures, posters, and petitions developed with the help of the Cologne Zoo have attempted to spread awareness on the subspecies and its conservation, for the sake of both local citizens and Vietnamese government officials. The species currently receives no special treatment under Vietnamese law, though hunting animals within protected areas without a permit is illegal. Breeding programs for the Vietnamese subspecies are run at the Me Linh Station for Biodiversity and Cologne Zoo. Isotope analyses have shown that the scales of captive bred individuals are enriched in carbon-13 and nitrogen-15, likely a result of being fed with protein-loaded feeding insects. This forensic technique may help to differentiate true captive bred individuals from wild caught lizards which are merely labelled as captive bred.

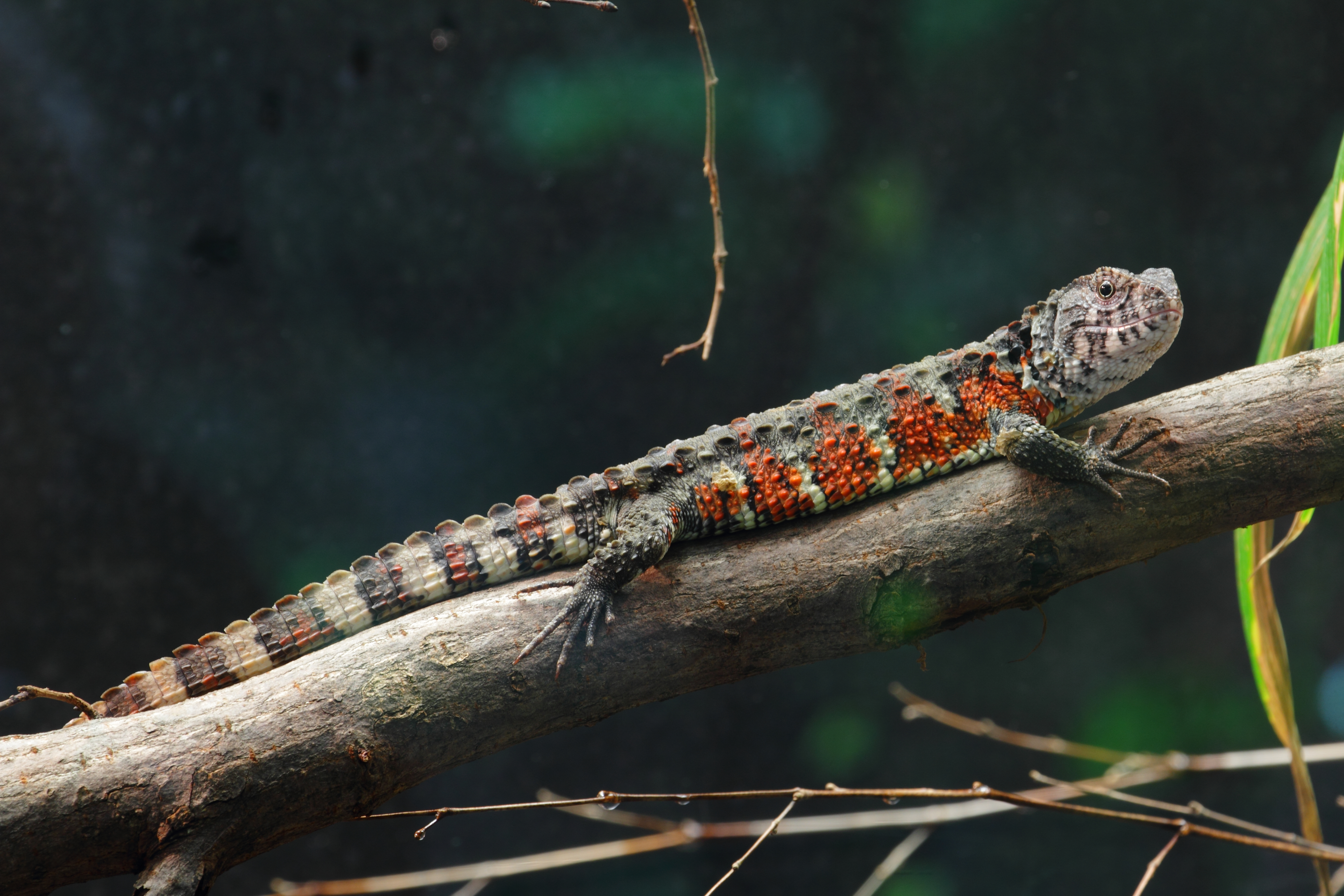
Schönbrunn Zoo

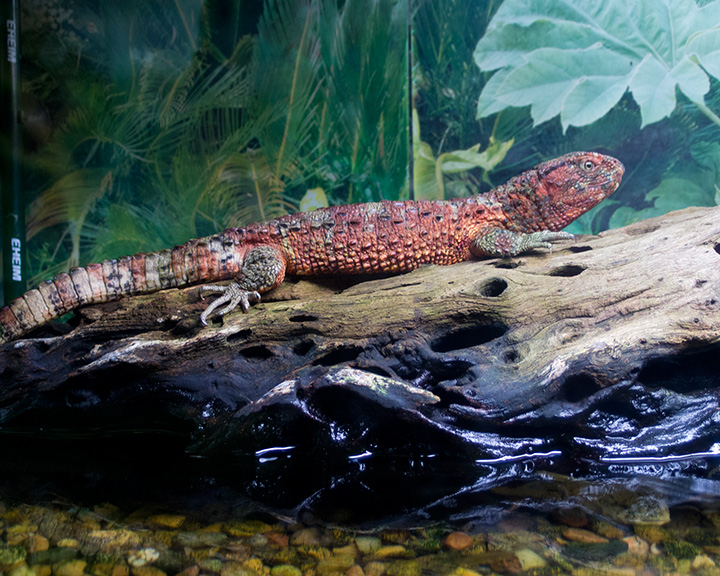
Houston Zoo

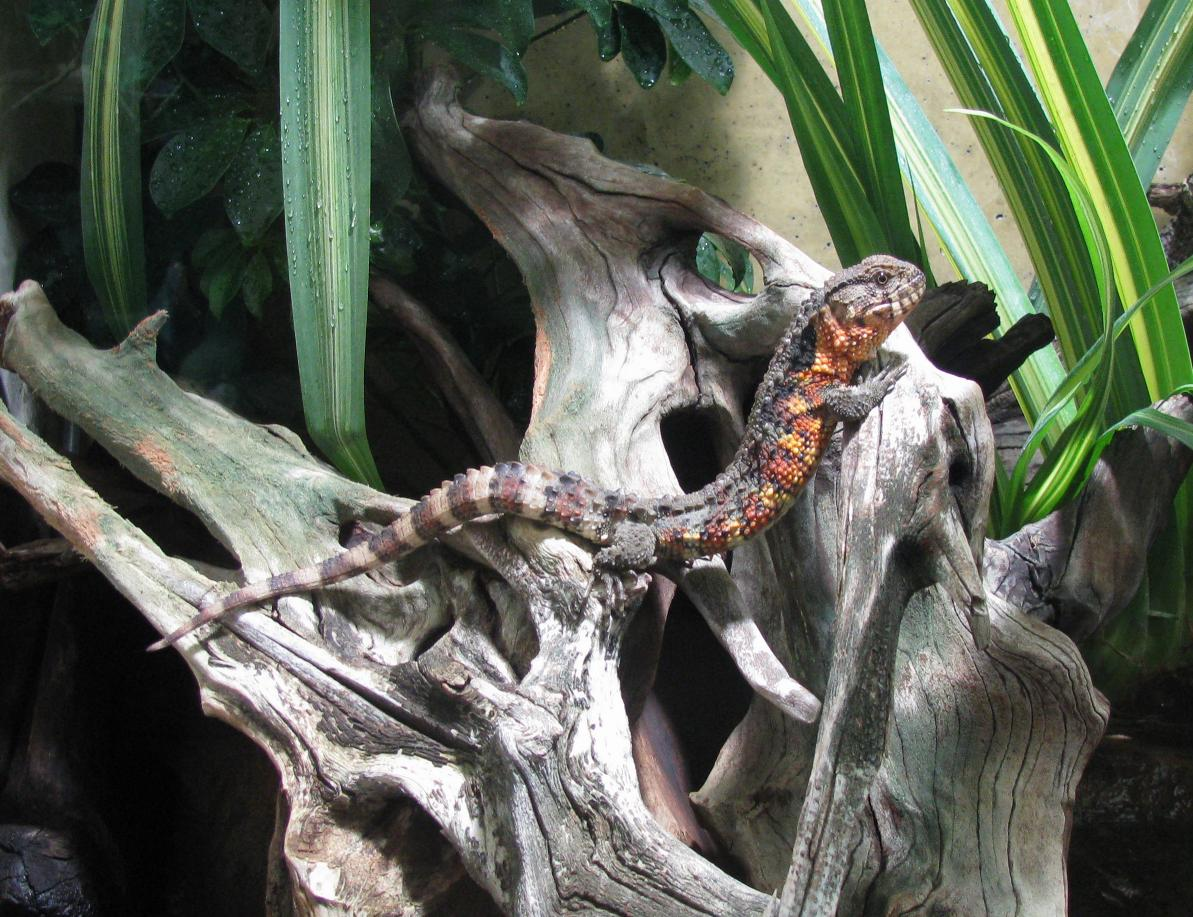
Wilhelma

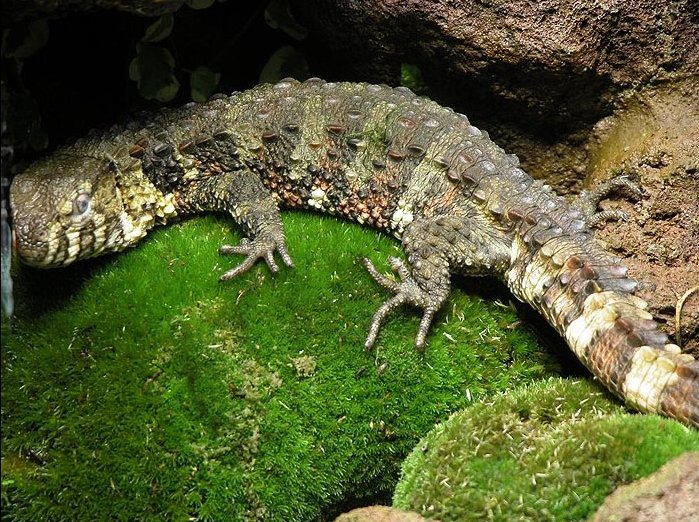
Cologne Zoo

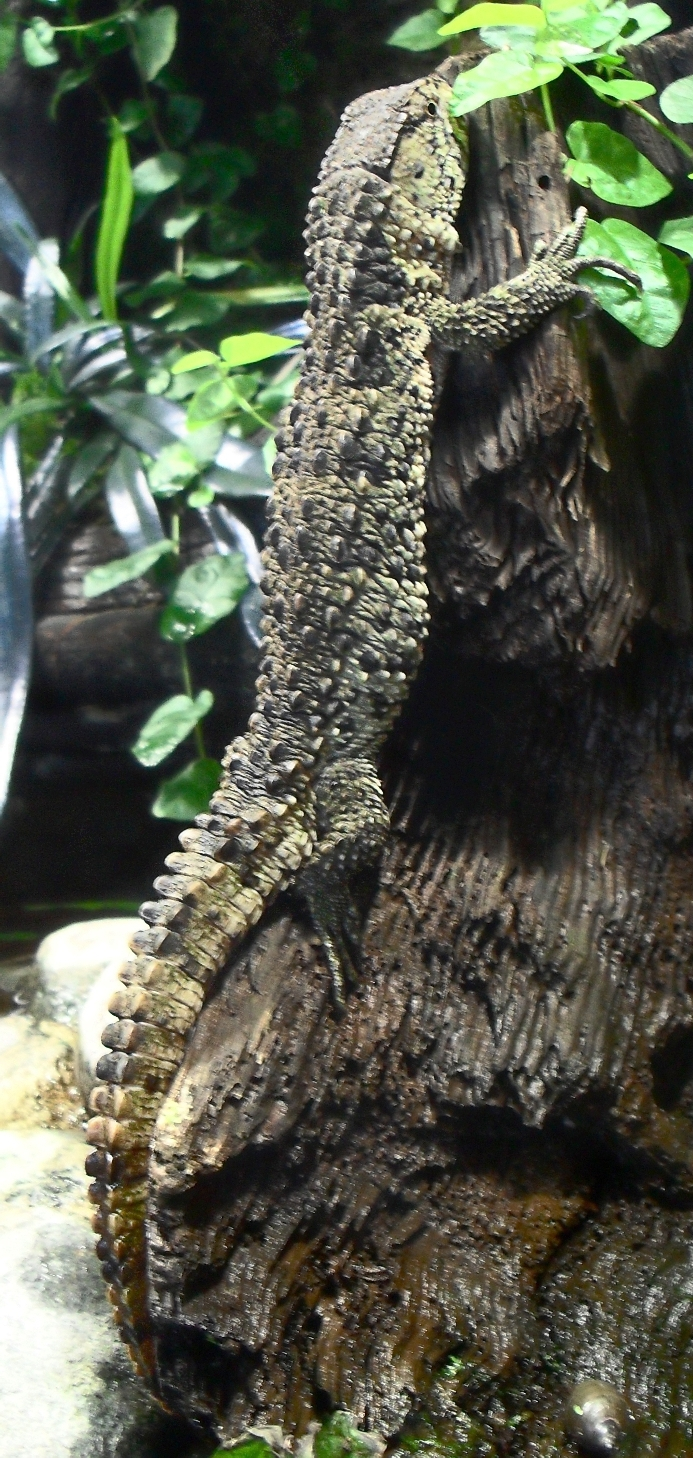
Leipzig Zoo
