= List of Serpentes families =

Snakes

Scientific classification
- Kingdom: Animalia
- Phylum: Chordata
- Class: Reptilia
- Order: Squamata
- Clade: Ophidia
- Suborder: Serpentes; Linnaeus, 1758

This is an overview of the suborder Serpentes, its two infraorders (subdivisions) and the families they contain. This is the group of reptiles commonly known as snakes.

== Taxonomy ==
There are two infraorders of living snakes: Alethinophidia and Scolecophidia. This separation is based primarily on morphological characteristics between family groups; however, more recently, the comparison of mitochondrial DNA has played its part.

As with most taxonomic classifications, there are many different interpretations of the evolutionary relationships. This had resulted in families being moved to different infraorders, the merging or splitting of infraorders and families. For instance, many sources classify Boidae and Pythonidae as the same family, or keep others, such as Elapidae and Hydrophiidae, separate for practical reasons despite their extremely close relationship.

Alethinophidia 15 families
Family	Common names	Example Species	Example Photo
Acrochordidae; Bonaparte, 1831	File snakes	Arafura file snake (Acrochordus arafurae)	
Aniliidae; Stejneger, 1907	Coral pipe snakes	False coral snake (Anilius scytale)	
Anomochilidae; Cundall, Wallach and Rossman, 1993	Dwarf pipe snakes	Mount Kinabalu dwarf pipe snake, (Anomochilus monticola)	
Atractaspididae; Günther, 1858	Mole vipers	Western purple-glossed snake (Amblyodipsas unicolor)	
Boidae; Gray, 1825	Boas	Amazon tree boa (Corallus hortulanus)	
Bolyeridae; Hoffstetter, 1946	Round island boas	Round Island burrowing boa (Bolyeria multocarinata)	
Colubridae; Oppel, 1811	Colubrids	Grass snake (Natrix natrix)	
Cylindrophiidae; Fitzinger, 1843	Asian pipe snakes	Red-tailed pipe snake (Cylindrophis ruffus)	
Elapidae; Boie, 1827	Cobras, coral snakes, mambas, kraits, sea snakes, sea kraits, Australian elapids	King cobra (Ophiophagus hannah)	
Loxocemidae; Cope, 1861	Mexican burrowing snakes	Mexican burrowing snake (Loxocemus bicolor)	
Pythonidae; Fitzinger, 1826	Pythons	Indian python (Python molurus)	
Tropidophiidae; Brongersma, 1951	Dwarf boas	Dusky dwarf boa (Tropidophis melanurus)	
Uropeltidae; Müller, 1832	Shield-tailed snakes, short-tailed snakes	Ocellated shield-tail (Uropeltis ocellatus)	
Viperidae; Oppel, 1811	Vipers, pitvipers, rattlesnakes	European asp (Vipera aspis)	
Xenopeltidae; Bonaparte, 1845	Sunbeam snakes	Sunbeam snake (Xenopeltis unicolor)	
Scolecophidia 3 families
Family	Common names	Example Species	Example Photo
Anomalepidae; Taylor, 1939	Dawn blind snakes	Dawn blind snake (Liotyphlops beui)	
Leptotyphlopidae; Stejneger, 1892	Slender blind snakes	Texas blind snake (Leptotyphlops dulcis)	
Typhlopidae; Merrem, 1820	Blind snakes	Black blind snake (Typhlops reticulatus)	

== See also ==
- List of snakes—Overview of all snake families and genera.
- List of Lacertilia families, lizards.
- List of Anuran families, frogs.
