= List of reptiles =

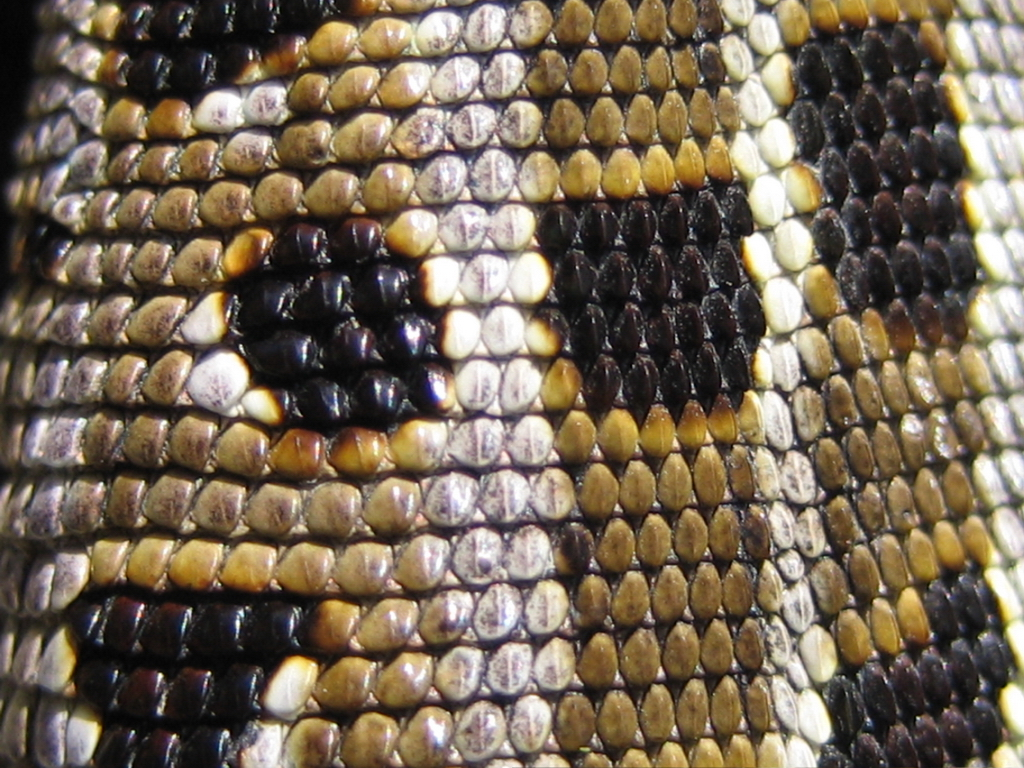
Skin of a sand lizard, showing squamate reptiles iconic scales

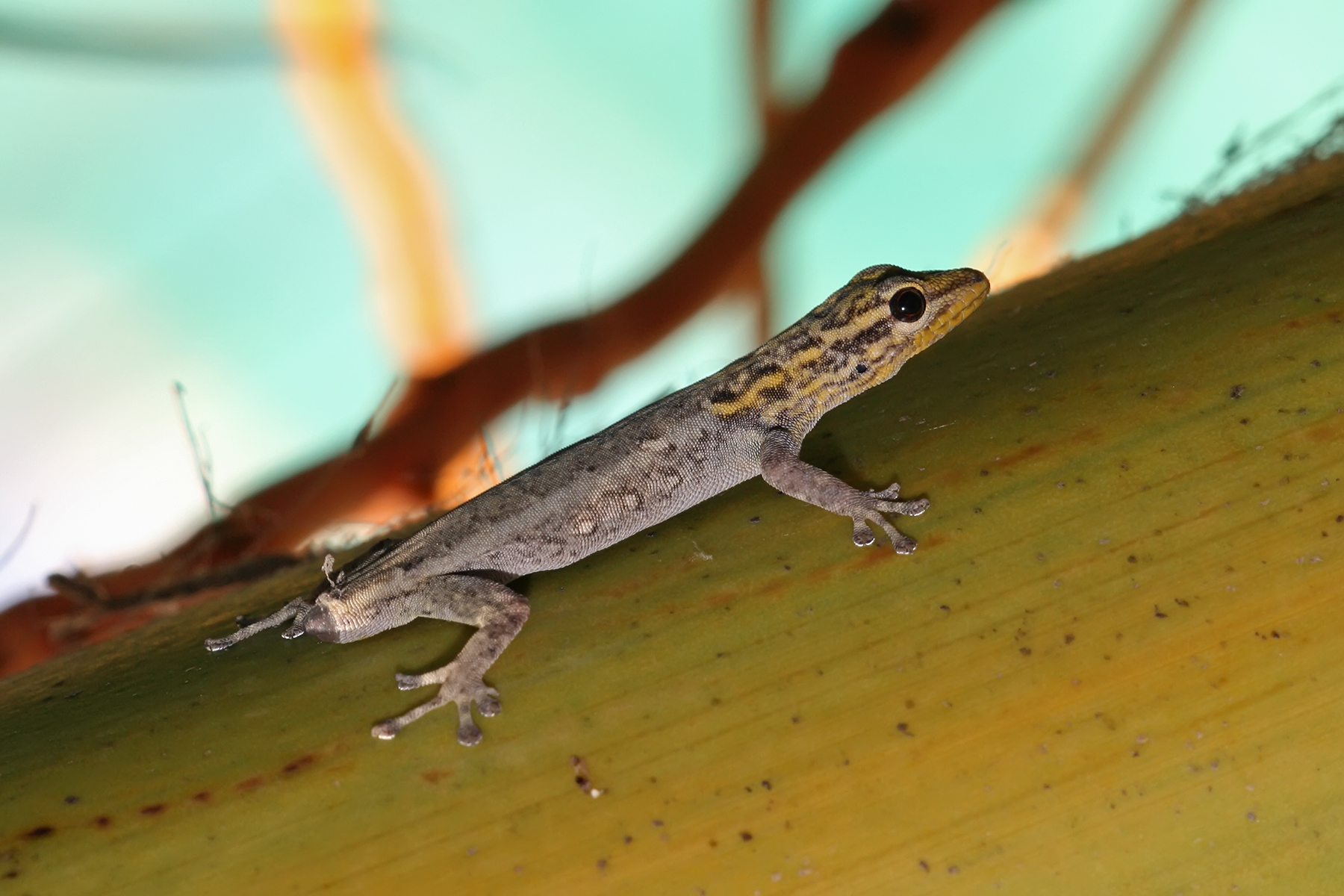
A white-headed dwarf gecko with shed tail

Reptiles are tetrapod animals in the class Reptilia, comprising today's turtles, crocodilians, snakes, amphisbaenians, lizards, tuatara, and their extinct relatives. The study of these traditional reptile orders, historically combined with that of modern amphibians, is called herpetology.

The following list of reptiles lists the vertebrate class of reptiles by family, spanning two subclasses. Reptile here is taken in its traditional (paraphyletic) sense, and thus birds are not included (although birds are considered reptiles in the cladistic sense).

== Subclass/informal group Anapsida ==
=== Order Testudines – turtles ===
- Suborder Cryptodira

- Family Chelydridae – common snapping turtles and alligator snapping turtle
- Family Emydidae – pond turtles and box turtles
- Family Testudinidae – tortoises
- Family Geoemydidae – Asian river turtles and allies
- Family Carettochelyidae – pignose turtles
- Family Trionychidae – softshell turtles
- Family Dermatemydidae – river turtles
- Family Kinosternidae – mud turtles
- Family Cheloniidae – sea turtles
- Family Dermochelyidae – leatherback turtles

- Suborder Pleurodira

- Family Chelidae – Austro-American sideneck turtles
- Family Pelomedusidae – Afro-American sideneck turtles
- Family Podocnemididae – Madagascan big-headed turtles and American sideneck river turtles

== Subclass Diapsida ==
=== Superorder Lepidosauria ===
==== Order Sphenodontia – tuatara ====
- Family Sphenodontidae

==== Order Squamata – scaled reptiles ====
- Family Agamidae – agamas
- Family Chamaeleonidae – chameleons
- Family Iguanidae

- Subfamily Corytophaninae – casquehead lizard
- Subfamily Iguaninae – iguanas
- Subfamily Leiocephalinae
- Subfamily Leiosaurinae
- Subfamily Liolaeminae
- Subfamily Oplurinae – Madagascar iguanids

- Family Crotaphytidae – collared and leopard lizards
- Family Phrynosomatidae – horned lizards
- Family Polychrotidae – anoles
- Family Hoplocercidae – wood lizards
- Family Tropiduridae – Neotropical ground lizards
- Family Gekkonidae – geckos
- Family Pygopodidae – legless lizards
- Family Dibamidae – blind lizards
- Family Cordylidae – spinytail lizards
- Family Gerrhosauridae – plated lizards
- Family Gymnophthalmidae – spectacled lizards
- Family Teiidae – whiptails and tegus
- Family Lacertidae – lacertids
- Family Amphisbaenidae – worm lizards
- Family Trogonophidae – shorthead worm lizards
- Family Bipedidae – two-legged worm lizards
- Family Scincidae – skinks
- Family Xantusiidae – night lizards
- Family Anguidae – glass lizards
- Family Anniellidae – American legless lizards
- Family Xenosauridae – knob-scaled lizards
- Family Helodermatidae – Gila monsters
- Family Lanthanotidae – earless monitor lizards
- Family Varanidae – monitor lizards

- Suborder Serpentes – snakes
- Infraorder Alethinophidia

- Family Acrochordidae – wart snakes
- Family Aniliidae – false coral snakes
- Family Anomochilidae – dwarf pipe snakes
- Family Atractaspididae – African burrowing asps, stiletto snakes
- Family Boidae – Gray, 1825 – boas, anacondas

- Subfamily Boinae
- Subfamily Erycinae – Old World sand boas

- Family Bolyeriidae – Mauritius snakes
- Family Colubridae – Colubrids, typical snakes

- Subfamily Xenodermatinae
- Subfamily Homalopsinae
- Subfamily Boodontinae
- Subfamily Pseudoxyrhophiinae
- Subfamily Colubrinae
- Subfamily Psammophiinae
- Subfamily Natricinae
- Subfamily Pseudoxenodontinae
- Subfamily Dipsadinae
- Subfamily Xenodontinae

- Family Cylindrophiidae – Asian pipe snakes
- Family Elapidae – cobras, coral snakes, mambas, sea snakes
- Family Loxocemidae – Mexican pythons
- Family Pythonidae – pythons
- Family Tropidophiidae – dwarf boas
- Family Uropeltidae – pipe snakes, shield-tailed snakes
- Family Viperidae – vipers, pitvipers

- Subfamily Azemiopinae – Fae's viper
- Subfamily Causinae – night adders
- Subfamily Crotalinae – pitvipers, rattlesnakes
- Subfamily Viperinae – true vipers

- Family Xenopeltidae – sunbeam snakes

- Infraorder Scolecophidia – blind snakes

- Family Anomalepididae – primitive blind snakes
- Family Leptotyphlopidae – slender blind snakes, thread snakes
- Family Typhlopidae – blind snakes, typical blind snakes

=== Division Archosauria ===
Superorder Crocodylomorpha

==== Order Crocodylia – crocodilians ====
- Suborder Eusuchia

- Family Crocodylidae – crocodiles
- Family Alligatoridae – alligators and caimans
- Family Gavialidae – gharials

=== Clade Dinosauria – dinosaurs ===
- Class Aves – birds (not included in this list)
- Multiple extinct groups

== See also ==
- Reptile
- List of regional reptiles lists
- List of birds
- List of snakes
- Herping
