= Xenopeltis intermedius =

Scientific classification
- Kingdom: Animalia
- Phylum: Chordata
- Class: Reptilia
- Order: Squamata
- Suborder: Serpentes
- Family: Xenopeltidae
- Genus: Xenopeltis
- Species: X. intermedius

Binomial name
- Xenopeltis intermedius Orlov, Snetkov., Ermakov, Nguyen, & Ananjeva, 2022

Species of snake

Xenopeltis intermedius is a non-venomous sunbeam snake species found in Vietnam.

The specific epithet intermedius refers to this species showing a number of morphological characteristics that are intermediate between Xenopeltis unicolor and X. hainanensis.
