= Tortricidae (disambiguation) =

Tortricidae is a family of moths, commonly known as tortrix moths or leafroller moths.

Tortricidae may also refer to:

- Taxonomic synonym for the family Cylindrophiidae, a.k.a. the Asian pipe snakes, a harmless group of reptiles found in Asia
- Taxonomic synonym for the family Xenopeltidae, a.k.a. the sunbeam snakes, a harmless group of reptiles found in Southeast Asia
