= Xenopeltis hainanensis =

Conservation status
- Least Concern (IUCN 3.1)

Scientific classification
- Kingdom: Animalia
- Phylum: Chordata
- Class: Reptilia
- Order: Squamata
- Suborder: Serpentes
- Family: Xenopeltidae
- Genus: Xenopeltis
- Species: X. hainanensis

Binomial name
- Xenopeltis hainanensis Hu & Zhao, 1972

Synonyms
- Xenopeltis hainanensis jidamingae – Zhao 1995

Species of snake

Xenopeltis hainanensis is a non-venomous sunbeam snake species found in China and Vietnam. This is a primitive snake known for its highly iridescent scales. No subspecies are recognized.

== Description ==
This snake grows to an average of about .5 to 1 m. A fossorial species, the head is wedge-shaped and narrow with little neck delineation, which makes it easy to push through the soil. Its most defining characteristic is its iridescent, highly polished scales that give this snake its common name (sunbeam snake). The dorsal scales a layer of dark (indigo-brown) pigmentation just below the surface on each scale that enhances the iridescence. The ventral scales are greyish-white.

This species differs from its sister taxon Xenopeltis unicolor in several ways. It has a singular postocular scale rather than two, fewer ventral, supralabial, and infralabial scales, a shorter tail, and fewer maxillary teeth.

The holotype of the species is Chengdu Institute of Biology specimen CIB 64III6016, a male collected in 1964. The paratype, CIB 64III6650, is a female collected the same year.

Both species together form the family Xenopeltidae, a primitive group of snakes with both boid and pythonid characteristics.

== Geographic range ==
Xenopeltis hainanensis is found in "isolated pockets" of southeastern China (from Guangxi east to Zhejiang and south to Hainan) and northern Vietnam. The type locality given is Dali village, Diaoluo Shan (Mount Diaoluo) on Hainan island, China.

== Habitat ==
This snake tends to live on forest slopes, at heights between 900 and 1100 metres above sea level.

== Behavior ==
These snakes are not venomous, but are constrictors, killing their prey by suffocation in their muscular coils. They are fossorial and spend most of their time below ground.

== Feeding ==
The diet is varied, consisting primarily of frogs, reptiles, including other snakes, and small mammals. The young look very similar to the adults, except that they have a strong white "collar" of scales evident just below the head. This coloration fades within the first year.

== Reproduction ==
This species of snake is oviparous, with females laying up to 10 eggs at a time.
