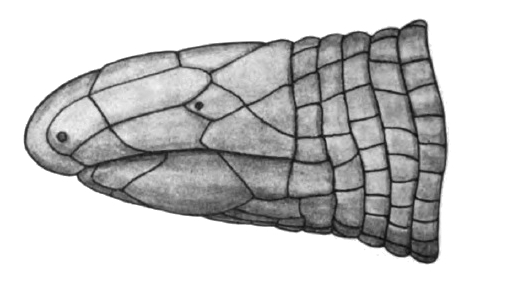
- Cadea palirostrata. Side view of head of type specimen (No. 2717, AMNH)

Scientific classification
- Kingdom: Animalia
- Phylum: Chordata
- Class: Reptilia
- Order: Squamata
- Clade: Lacertoidea
- Clade: Lacertibaenia
- Clade: Amphisbaenia
- Family: Cadeidae; Vidal & Hedges, 2007
- Genus: Cadea; Gray, 1844

Species
- see text

= Cadea (lizard) =

Genus of amphisbaenians

Cadea is a genus of amphisbaenians, commonly known as Cuban keel-headed worm lizards, in the family Cadeidae. Two species are placed in this genus. Both species are endemic to Cuba.

== Species ==
- Cadea blanoides (Stejneger, 1916) – spotted amphisbaena
- Cadea palirostrata (Dickerson, 1916) – sharp-nosed amphisbaena, Dickerson's worm lizard, Cuban sharp-nosed amphisbaena
