= List of Lacertilia families =

Lizards

Scientific classification
- Kingdom: Animalia
- Phylum: Chordata
- Class: Reptilia
- Superorder: Lepidosauria
- Order: Squamata; Günther, 1867

This is a list of the extant lizard families. Lizards are an informal group of squamates.

== Taxonomy ==
There are five infraorders which separate the lizards, these are- Diploglossa, Gekkota, Iguania, Platynota and Scincomorpha. This separation is based mainly on morphological similarities between family groups.

The Diploglossans and Platynotans are two closely related infraorders which are very diverse families. Very few generalisations can be placed upon these families morphologically. Many species are limbless, while others have fully formed limbs. It is believed that these lizards are the closest lizard relation to the snakes.

The Gekkotans are the second most diverse group of lizards. They can be morphologically distinguished by the absence of temporal arches, which allows greater moveability of the head. Most species also have cloacal sacs and fixed eyelids.

The Iguanians are another diverse group of lizards. All iguanians are fully limbed. Most species ambush their prey, capture it with their tongue and have skin modification, such as crests and fans, used for many different reasons.

The Scincomorphs are the most diverse group of lizards, accounting for almost half the species of lizards. The major distinguishing morphological feature of the Scincomorphs, is the presence of unsocketed teeth on the inner face of the jaw bones. They also lack the skin modifications present in many of the iguanians. This family contains varying degrees of limb reduction, from completely formed limbs to completely absent of limbs.

As with most taxonomic classifications, there are many different interpretations of the evolutionary relationships. These include moving of families to different infraorders, merging or splitting of the infraorders and merging and splitting of the families.

Diploglossa
Family	Common names	Example Species	Example Photo
Anguidae; Oppel, 1811	Glass lizards	Slowworm (Anguis fragilis)	
Anniellidae; Gray, 1852	American legless lizards	California legless lizard (Anniella pulchra)	
Xenosauridae; Cope, 1866	Knob-scaled lizards	Chinese crocodile lizard (Shinisaurus crocodilurus)	
Gekkota
Family	Common names	Example Species	Example Photo
Dibamidae; Boulenger, 1884	Blind lizards	Dibamus nicobaricum	-
Gekkonidae; Gray, 1825	Geckos	Thick-tailed Gecko (Underwoodisaurus milii)	
Pygopodidae; Boulenger, 1884	Legless lizards	Burton's legless lizard (Lialis burtonis)	-
Eublepharidae	Eyelid Geckos	Leopard Gecko (Eublepharis macularius)	-
Iguania
Family	Common names	Example Species	Example Photo
Agamidae; Spix, 1825	Agamas	Eastern bearded dragon (Pogona barbata)	
Chamaeleonidae; Gray, 1825	Chameleons	Veiled chameleon (Chamaeleo calyptratus)	
Corytophanidae; Frost & Etheridge, 1989	Casquehead lizards	Plumed basilisk (Basiliscus plumifrons)	
Crotaphytidae; Frost & Etheridge, 1989	Collared and leopard lizards	Common collared lizard (Crotaphytus collaris)	
Hoplocercidae; Frost & Etheridge, 1989	Wood lizards or clubtails	Club tail iguana (Hoplocercus spinosus)	-
Iguanidae	Iguanas	Marine iguana (Amblyrhynchus cristatus)	
Leiosauridae; Frost et al., 2001	-	Darwin's iguana (Diplolaemus darwinii)	-
Opluridae; Frost & Etheridge, 1989	Madagascan iguanas	Chalarodon (Chalarodon madagascariensis)	-
Phrynosomatidae; Frost & Etheridge, 1989	Earless, spiny, tree, side-blotched and horned lizards	Greater earless lizard (Cophosaurus texanus)	
Polychrotidae; Frost & Etheridge, 1989	Anoles	Caronlina anole (Anolis carolinensis)	
Tropiduridae; Frost & Etheridge, 1989	Neotropical ground lizards	(Microlophus peruvianus)	
Platynota
Family	Common names	Example Species	Example Photo
Helodermatidae	Gila monsters	Gila Monster (Heloderma suspectum)	
Lanthanotidae	Earless Monitor	Earless Monitor (Lanthanotus borneensis)	-
Varanidae	Monitors lizards	Perentie (Varanus giganteus)	
Scincomorpha
Family	Common names	Example Species	Example Photo
Cordylidae	Spinytail lizards	Girdle-tailed lizard (Cordylus warreni)	
Gerrhosauridae	Plated lizards	Sudan Plated Lizard (Gerrhosaurus major)	
Gymnophthalmidae	Spectacled lizards	-	-
Lacertidae; Oppel, 1811	Wall or true lizards	Ocellated Lizard (Lacerta lepida)	
Scincidae; Oppel, 1811	Skinks	Western Blue-tongued Skink (Tiliqua occipitalis)	
Teiidae	Tegus or whiptails	Blue Tegu (Tupinambis teguixin)	
Xantusiidae	Night lizards	Granite Night Lizard (Xantusia henshawi)	
