= Cerberophis =

Cerberophis Temporal range: ~Maastrichtian

Scientific classification
- Kingdom: Animalia
- Phylum: Chordata
- Class: Reptilia
- Order: Squamata
- Suborder: Serpentes
- Infraorder: Alethinophidia
- Genus: †Cerberophis; Longrich et al., 2012

Fossil genus of snake

Cerberophis is an extinct genus of alethinophidian snakes from the late Cretaceous (Maastrichtian) Hell Creek Formation of Montana. The type species, Cerberophis robustus, was described and named by paleontologists Nicholas R. Longrich, Bhart-anjan S. Bhullar, and Jacques Gauthier in 2012 with the name translating to "robust Cerberus-snake."

== Description ==
Cerberophis is one of the largest snakes known from the Mesozoic, having an estimated length of around 1.7 to 2 m (5.6 to 6.6 ft) long, and has an estimated weight of around 2.9 kg (6.4 lb). It is likely one of the, if not the largest snakes of the Hell creek Formation that we currently know of. It has a vertebral width of around 17 mm (0.67 in) long, and a moderately sized neural arch, which is decently large for many snakes that lived in the Mesozoic.

== Classification ==
Cerberophis was a basal alethinophidian, the group that includes all living snakes except blind snakes and thread snakes. As of now, Cerberophis is not assigned to any specific family groups and is still relatively poor in any phylogenetic knowledge of it.

== Paleobiology ==
Cerberophis was likely a small-prey specialist, feeding on small vertebrates such as mammals, lizards, amphibians, and the young of many larger reptiles such as dinosaurs, crocodilians, and turtles. The vertebra of Ceroberophis is known to have enlarged synapophyses, the articulated attachment point on vertebrae to where a rib attaches. It also is known from massive prezygapophyses, articulated processes that locks with the adjacent vertebrae.

== Paleoecology ==
Cerberophis likely lived in subtropical or tropical warm floodplains alongside many mammals, dinosaurs, birds, and other reptiles such as crocodilians, non-crocodilian crocodylomorphs, turtles, lizards, choristoderans, and pterosaurs. The area was likely adorned with trees, ferns, and more plants such as horsetails. Like many other species it lived alongside, Cerberophis is not seen after the K-Pg extinction, as it and 83% of squamate groups were wiped out.
