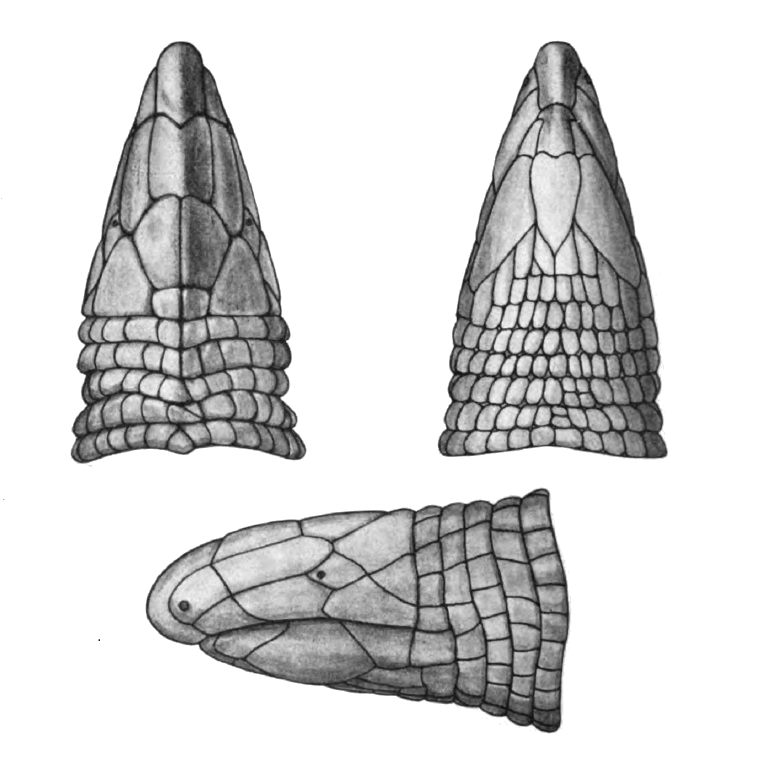
- Head

Conservation status
- Least Concern (IUCN 3.1)

Scientific classification
- Kingdom: Animalia
- Phylum: Chordata
- Class: Reptilia
- Order: Squamata
- Clade: Amphisbaenia
- Family: Cadeidae
- Genus: Cadea
- Species: C. palirostrata

Binomial name
- Cadea palirostrata Dickerson, 1916

Synonyms
- Amphisbaena palirostrata

= Cadea palirostrata =

Species of lizard

Cadea palirostrata, also known as Dickerson's worm lizard or the Cuban sharp-nosed amphisbaena, is a species of amphisbaenian in the family Cadeidae, described by herpetologist Mary Cynthia Dickerson in 1913. This species is endemic to Isla de la Juventud (formerly Isle of Pines), an island of western Cuba.
