= Joseph Liboschitz =

Joseph Liboschitz or Osip Yakovlevich Liboshich (Russian: Осип Яковлевич Либошиц; 1783–1824) was a Russian physician and naturalist from Vilnius.

== Life ==
From 1798, he was a student at the University of Vilnius, obtaining his medical doctorate in 1806 at the University of Tartu. Subsequently, he practiced medicine in his hometown of Vilnius, later relocating to St. Petersburg, where he served as a court physician (from 1812) and personal physician to Tsar Alexander I (from 1822). In St. Petersburg, he founded a children's hospital. With Carl Bernhard von Trinius he edited the exsiccata Description des Mousses qui croissent aux environs de St. Pétersbourg et de Moscou (1811).

Liboschitz was the first to provide a description of Rehmannia chinensis (synonymous with Rehmannia glutinosa), an important herb in traditional Chinese medicine.

== Selected writings ==
- Flore des environs de St.-Pétersbourg et de Moscou, 1811 – Flora of the environs of St. Petersburg and Moscow.
- Enumeratio fungorum quos in nonnullis provinciis Imperii Ruthenici, 1817.
- Naturgeschichte der Amphibien, 1817 (with Friedrich Tiedemann and Michael Oppel) – Natural history of amphibians

== Sources ==
- "Либошиц, Осип Яковлевич" . Brockhaus and Efron Encyclopedic Dictionary (in Russian). 1906.
