= Spotted amphisbaena =

Conservation status
- Least Concern (IUCN 3.1)

Scientific classification
- Kingdom: Animalia
- Phylum: Chordata
- Class: Reptilia
- Order: Squamata
- Suborder: Lacertoidea
- Clade: Amphisbaenia
- Family: Cadeidae
- Genus: Cadea
- Species: C. blanoides

Binomial name
- Cadea blanoides Stejneger, 1916

Synonyms
- Amphisbaena punctata Bell, 1827; Cadea blanoides Stejneger, 1916 (nomen novum)

Species of amphisbaenian

The spotted amphisbaena (Cadea blanoides) is a species of amphisbaenian in the family Cadeidae. This species is endemic to the island of Cuba.
