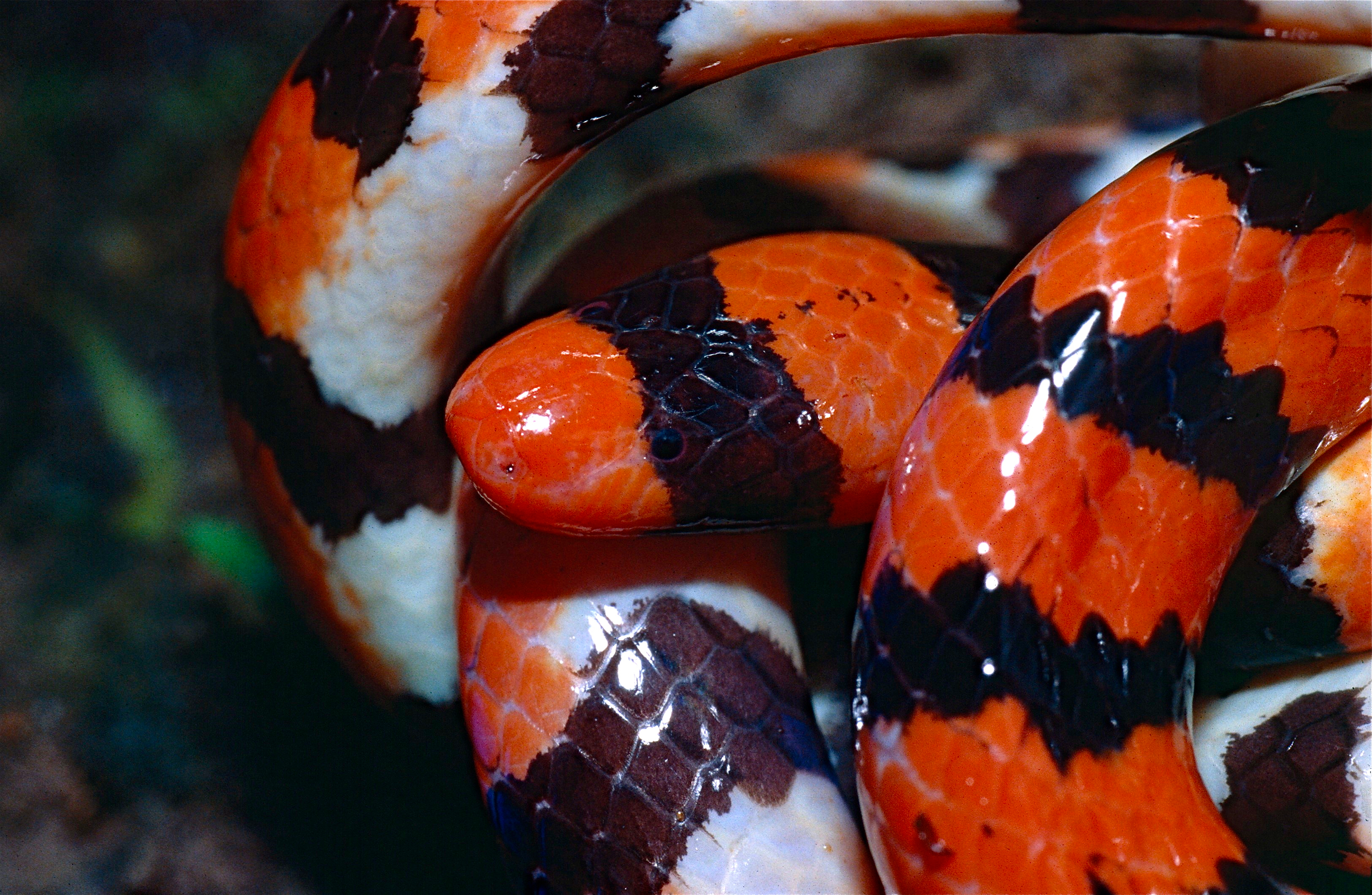
- An amerophidian snake, the American red pipe snake or false coral snake (Anilius scytale)

Scientific classification
- Kingdom: Animalia
- Phylum: Chordata
- Class: Reptilia
- Order: Squamata
- Suborder: Serpentes
- Infraorder: Alethinophidia
- Clade: Amerophidia; Vidal, Nicolas, Anne-Sophie Delmas, and S. Blair Hedges (2007)

Families
- Aniliidae; Tropidophiidae; †Afrotortrix; †Australophis

= Amerophidia =

Amerophidia Temporal range: 84.9–0 Ma Late Cretaceous to Present

Clade of snakes

The Amerophidia, also known as amerophidian snakes, are a clade of snakes that contains two families: Aniliidae (containing a single species, Anilius scytale, the American red pipe snake or false coral snake) and the boa-like Tropidophiidae (containing two genera, Trachyboa (with two species) and Tropidophis (with either 17 or 33, depending on the authority)).

The sister-group relationship between these two families is surprising and unintuitive when only morphology is considered, because Aniliidae more closely resemble the Asian pipe snakes in the families Cylindrophiidae and Anomochilidae, whereas Tropidophiidae more closely resemble constricting, macrostomatan snakes such as Boidae and Pythonidae. However, every major phylogenetic analysis since 2007 has found support for the idea that these two families are one another's closest relatives, despite having last shared a common ancestor about 91 MYA [CI: 77-104]. The oldest fossil member of this family is the extinct Australophis from the Late Cretaceous of Argentina.
