= Herping =

Act of searching for amphibians or reptiles

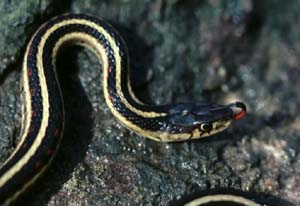
Common Garter Snake

Herping is the act of searching for amphibians or reptiles. The term, often used by professional and amateur herpetologists, comes from the word "herp", which comes from the same Greek root as herpetology, herpet-, meaning "creeping". The term herp is a shorthand used to refer to the two classes of ectothermic tetrapods (i.e., amphibians and reptiles).

Herping consists of many activities; anyone can find reptiles or amphibians while herping. The activity or technique depends on the terrain and target species. These include, but are not limited to, searching under natural cover objects (such as rocks and logs) and artificial cover objects (such as trash or construction debris), sometimes called 'flipping', as in 'flipping rocks' or 'flipping boards'; locating calling amphibians by ear, commonly done in pairs in order to triangulate on the location of the frog or toad; muddling or noodling for turtles by feeling around in mud or around objects submerged in water; dip-netting for aquatic amphibians and turtles; noosing lizards with wire or fishing line on the end of a pole; lantern walking, which involves searching habitat on foot at night; and road cruising or road riding, which refers to the practice of driving along a road slowly in search of reptiles or amphibians that are crossing the road or basking on the road surface, it's primarily used for finding snakes.

General herping can take place any time, anywhere, whereas road herping or "cruising" usually takes place at dawn or dusk, or during rainstorms. Road cruising during rainstorms has a high probability of finding toads or frogs that may be otherwise impossible to find during normal conditions.

== Photography ==
Photography of reptiles and amphibians is largely dependent on digital cameras with a macro lens. An adequate lens is necessary for successfully efficiently capturing many species' images, as it keeps photographer and subject from being injured, as well as maintaining the natural behaviour of the subject. In some cases, it is more practical to temporarily capture and pose the subject manually such as when moving or obscured by debris, such as when a fossorial snake is scurrying into its burrow.

=== Equipment ===
Herping activities are often recorded using the latest digital camera or camcorder technology. As many as three flashes may be used for optimal lighting, especially in challenging environments such as tropical rainforests. The multiple flashes create three distracting catchlights in the subject's eye; two may be edited out of the photo by using Photoshop or similar applications.

Photographing venomous snakes at close range places the photographer within striking range, and various shields have been developed to minimize the danger. These bite shields often take the form of an opaque or transparent plastic covering which surrounds the camera and exposes only the lens. Modifications are made to accommodate various flash setups. Snakes are temperature-dependent and are often active in large numbers during optimal weather. Consequently, the greatest danger in venomous snake photography may lie in a bite from an unseen snake near the photographer. Great care must be taken to survey the area, and bites of this nature have occurred on several occasions.

The safest way to photograph venomous snakes is never to touch them. Snakes may be manipulated with a variety of specialized hooks, ranging from large hooks used for moving snakes, to extendable pocket hooks used for minor posing adjustments. Bite-resistant gloves may also be worn.

=== Setups ===
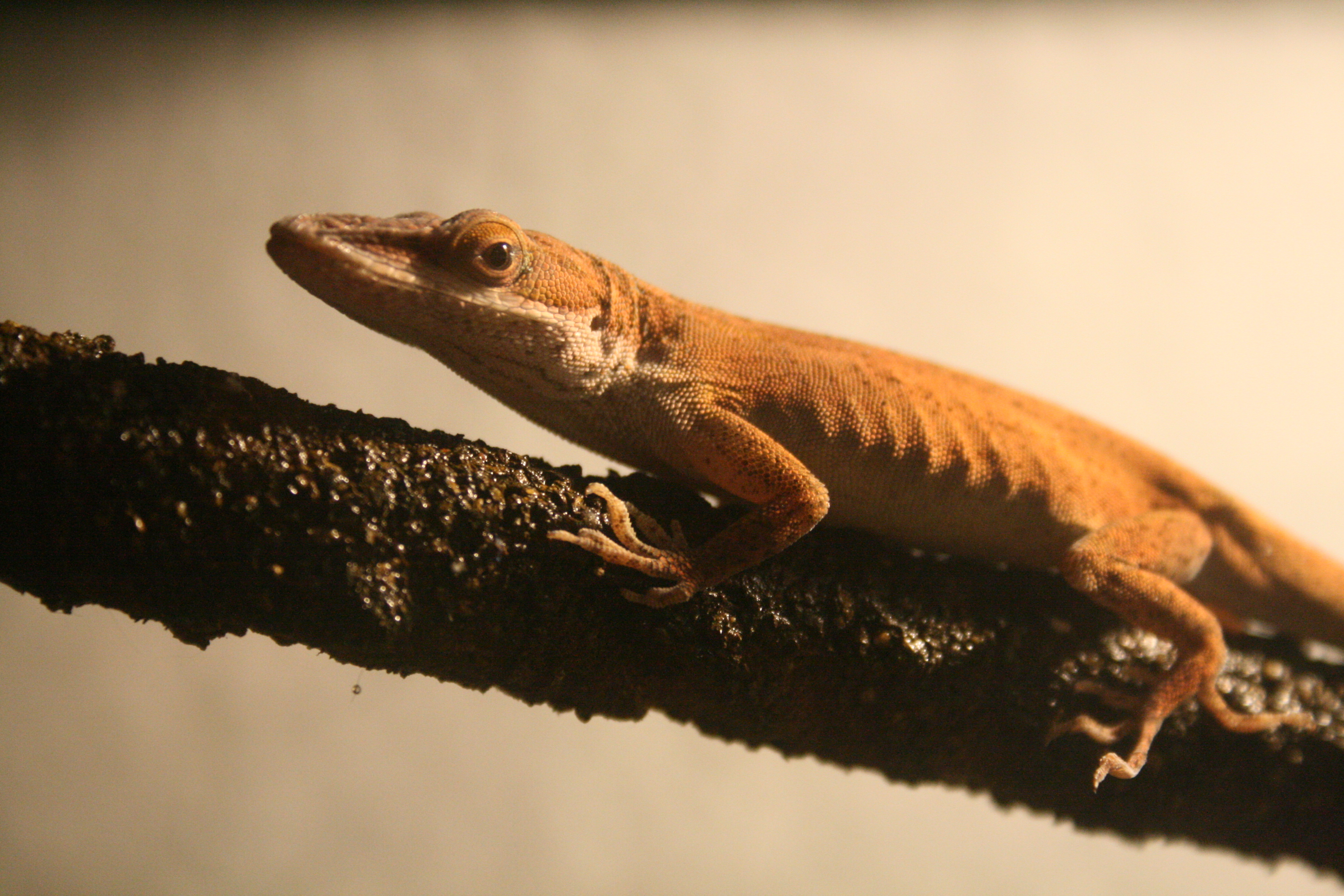
A studio set-up with a Carolina anole

Herptiles are extremely weather-sensitive and often appear in heavy rain or other challenging photographic conditions. Some photographers carry cardboard boxes which can be modified in the field to create tiny sets for photography. In a desert area, sand is sprinkled on the bottom of the box and desert debris is scattered about. In wet areas, mossy sets are often developed, which work well for salamanders. The herp is posed to show identifying features and can be photographed at leisure, creating a realistic photo. During heavy rain or cold temperatures, this "studio" work is usually done in the back of an SUV or similar vehicle.

For aquatic herptiles, early spring is often the best period to find them, as aquatic vegetation is still sparse. Aquariums with natural or pre fitted substrate may be used to obtain natural photographs. The extent of aquatic setups is limited only by the photographer's imagination, and elaborate studio setups have been used to photograph specialized scenes like basilisks running on water.

=== Techniques ===
Because reptiles and amphibians are often agitated when captured, various techniques have evolved to pacify subjects of herpetological photography. One technique involves placing a hat or similar object over an animal (typically a snake) so that it coils and rests quietly. The object is then quickly lifted off the animal and a series of photos are taken. Assistants are often standing by out-of-frame to head off escape attempts.

== Field techniques ==
Many techniques are used when a person goes "herping" or looking for reptiles and amphibians. One technique is known as road running, road cruising, or cruising. This is done by riding in a vehicle and travelling down stretches of road at a slow speed to count or catch animals. The use of a road as a natural transect can generate estimates of species density by cruising the road at peak migration time. Similarly, driving roads at night during anuran breeding times can yield a high diversity of species. The North American Amphibian Monitoring Program (NAAMP) uses road surveys to log a species count into a database to study amphibian population across the nation. This is done by travelling down a set route and stopping at predetermined spots and listening for a few minutes and writing down every species that was heard at that location.

Another technique for observing reptiles for research or photo opportunities is the use of cover boards. Silvy (2012) suggests that the use of metal and wood cover boards be set at least two months before searching. These boards act like natural cover for herpetofauna to hide.

Tree frogs can be caught and photographed by using PVC pipes that are capped on the bottom and hung vertically in a tree near water. If aquatic species are the target species the use of an aquatic funnel trap can be used. Drift fences have been used with a high success rate for capturing snakes. The use of drift fences along with a pit-fall or funnel box trap has yielded high success. The length of the fence is variable, but the longer the fence results in a higher success rate. The fence is set with traps in the middle and/or the ends. Snakes encounter the fence and are directed or lead to the trap. Care must be taken in providing enough cover so the species do not die of heat exhaustion. Identifying all the species in the trap is recommended so an accidental envenomation is avoided. Pitfall traps are small buckets that are placed in holes dugout next to the drift fence.

Turtles can be caught by using a variety of techniques; hoop traps, basking traps, floating pitfall traps, and funnel traps are among the best traps to use. Basking traps are used to catch basking turtles. These traps float on the surface and have an elevated platform for the turtle to bask. The net is underwater so they cannot escape once they fall into the trap.

== Tourism ==
Herp-related tourism, like bird-related tourism, is on the rise. Because there are several hundred birders for every herper, herp-related tourism presently has a negligible economic impact. Fortunately, there is no way to engineer wildlife preserves for a specified vertebrate group. Instead, large areas of wilderness are conserved, benefiting all wildlife. Some of the more popular herping destinations include the United States, Costa Rica, the Amazon, Madagascar, Thailand, Malaysia, Vietnam, Indonesia, and Australia.

Other countries such as India and South Africa possess tremendous herpetological diversity and there are entrepreneurial individuals developing ecotourism infrastructure in these areas. One example is Exo-Terra, a division of the Hagen pet supplies company, which since 2004 has travelled to a different tropical African country each year. The company also holds an annual photography contest that showcases some of the best herp photography in the world. The winner of the photo contest goes on the next trip.

== Geographical differences ==
In Canada and other high-latitude countries, the herping season lasts 6–8 months, depending on the area. Ontario is the most herpetologically diverse province in Canada. While species lists may seem high, many Canadian herps have extremely limited ranges and exist only in isolated populations. Many Canadian herp species are threatened and in some cases, great care is taken to protect remnant populations.

The United States contains a large number of different habitats and thus has a wide diversity of reptiles and amphibians. In some parts of the country, such as South Florida and South Texas, herping can be productive year-round because of moderate winter temperatures. In most cooler parts of the country the herps hibernate in the winter and thus are mostly inaccessible to herpers. Popular herping destinations in the United States are southern California, southern Arizona, Texas, and Florida. These states boast an incredible diversity of herps as well as several species that are highly sought after by herps. The highest diversity of salamander in the world can be found in the southern Appalachians. It is no coincidence that all of these states are in the southern part of the country; reptiles and amphibians are ectothermic (cold-blooded) and thus are typically more abundant in warmer climates.

== Media portrayal ==
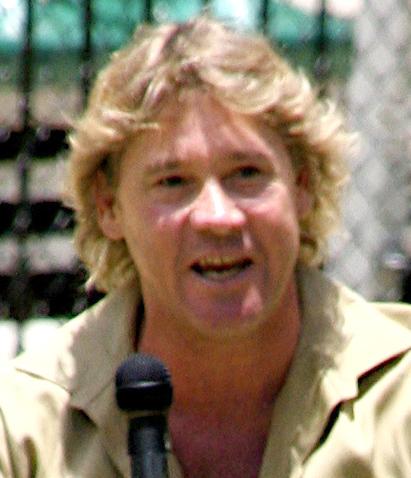
Steve Irwin, one of the best-known TV herpetologists

Because fear of snakes is widespread, footage of snake hunters draws large audiences and boosts ratings. Herping television programs usually exaggerate the danger of a herping encounter. Menacing music and intense camera angles are used to build excitement in the audience. It can be difficult to locate wild herps on demand. Because of the time and budgetary constraints of filming a wildlife television program, captive animals are sometimes placed in natural settings for the host to "discover" and capture. In some cases, the host may even agitate a calm animal to create excitement. Some of the best-known television herpetologists include:

- Austin Stevens
- Jeff Corwin
- Steve Irwin
- Brady Barr
- Mark O'Shea
- Rob Bredl

== Safety ==
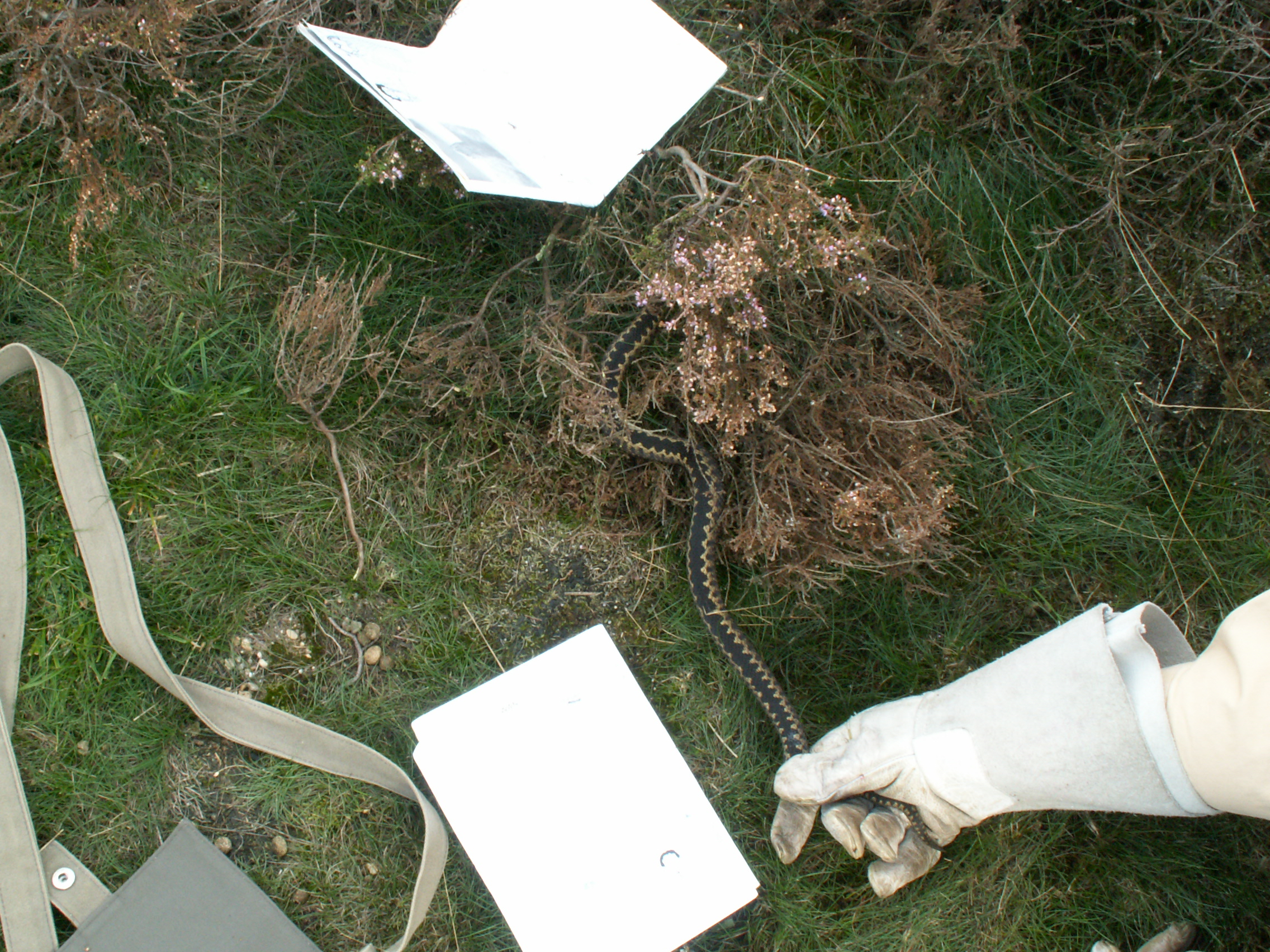
Field researcher using heavy welder's gloves to handle a European adder

Herping can potentially be a dangerous activity if not pursued with proper caution. A strike from a venomous snake can potentially be life-threatening. Other herping activities, especially "flipping," put a herper at risk of accidentally coming in contact with a scorpion, centipede, or spider. Safety equipment used to mitigate such dangers includes snake hooks, snake tongs, boots and gloves.

== Ethical and legal issues ==
Field herpers encompass a wide ethical spectrum, ranging from behavioural observation without approaching the animal to "feeder" animal collection for existing herpetoculture. The majority of herpers practice careful capture and release in the same spot, as many herps have their own territories and replacing them somewhere else would be a disturbance. As wilderness areas shrink, herpers are concentrated into smaller areas, and commercial collectors often encounter field biologists which may have quite different approaches to their study animals. Many species are also threatened or endangered and thus it is illegal to take them from the wild. Another consideration is spreading of diseases, such as the fungus Batrachochytrium dendrobatidis responsible for a worldwide decline in amphibian populations, which may be spread inadvertently by humans.

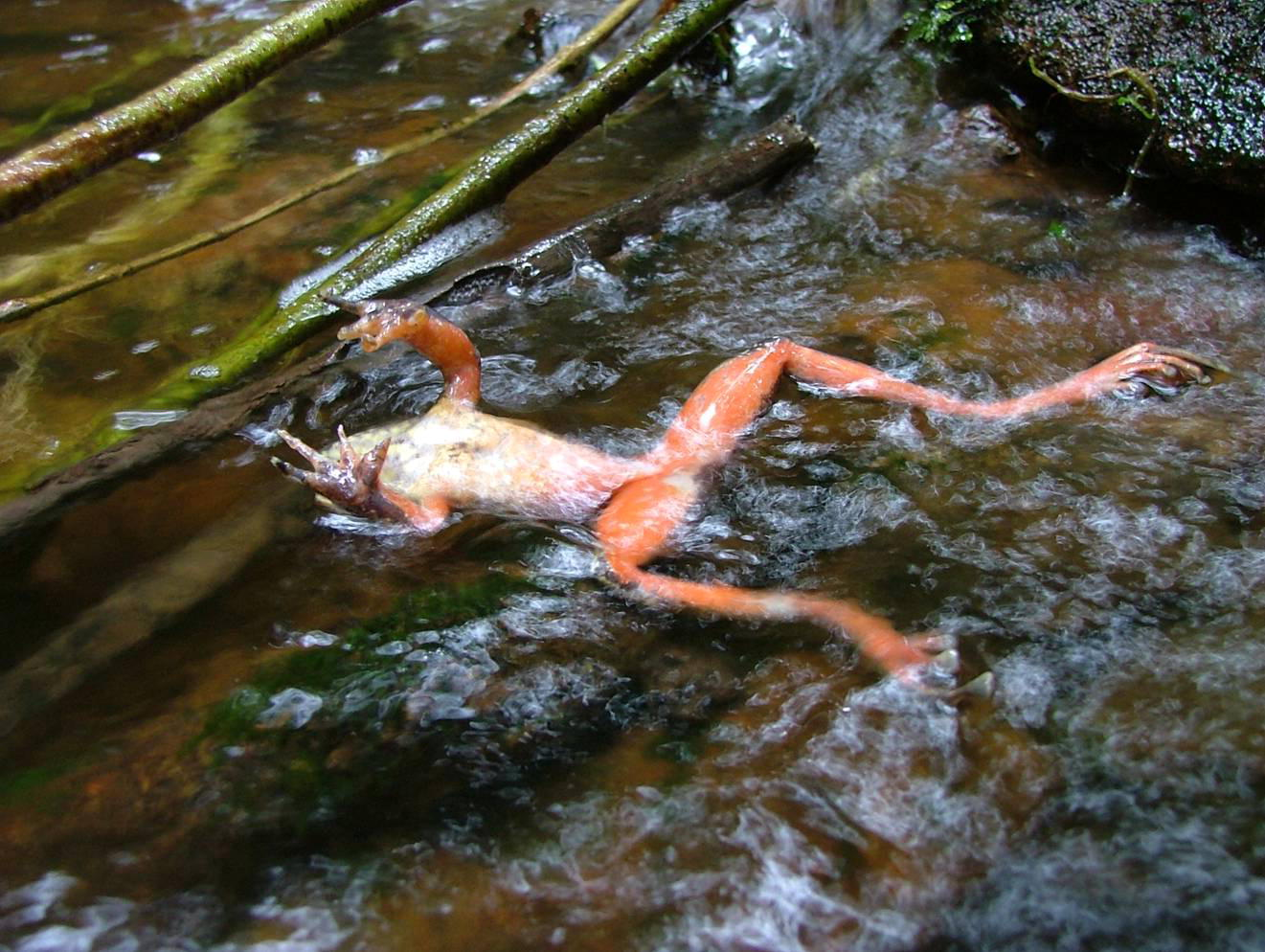
A frog dying from chytrid-infection, a human spread parasitic fungus

Since many reptiles and amphibians are nocturnal, herpers often remove animals temporarily for daylight photo sessions. The animals are then replaced exactly where found. There is no "herper's code" and ethical considerations are left to the individual. From time to time, albino and other unusually-coloured animals are encountered and these are sometimes kept for herpetoculture. The ethical justification in these cases is that conspicuous animals would be easy prey in the wild. Although true in the case of albino or other light-coloured animals, this is not true, for example, when normally barred individuals are born with striped patterns. In this case, the motive is usually commercial, with the collector planning to develop a striped bloodline and charge high prices for an exclusive morph.

There are many different laws in place that affect herps. Laws vary by country and state and are designed to protect the wildlife and habitats. In most states, a hunting license is required to collect reptiles and amphibians. Some states are more strict than others in terms of the herping-related legislature. In Texas, for example, it is illegal to collect herps on public land, and thus the "road cruising" strategy described above is illegal. Herpers should be careful to obey all laws in areas that they hunt. Lawbreaking herpers risk fines or even legal prosecution.

== See also ==
- Birdwatching
- Ethnoherpetology
- Herpetoculture
- List of herpetologists
- List of reptiles
- List of regional reptiles lists
- Ophiology
- Zoology
