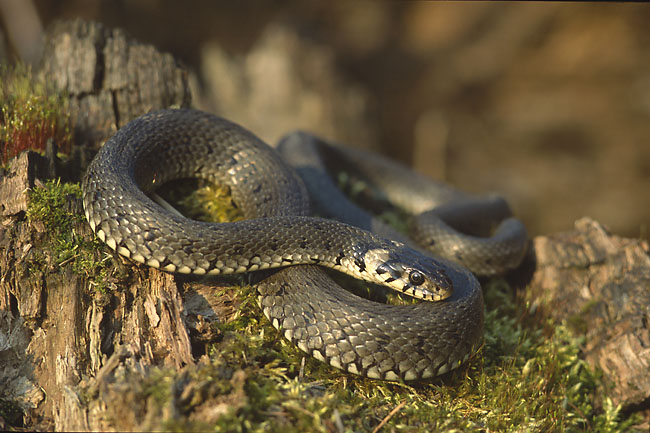
- Grass snake, Natrix natrix

Scientific classification
- Kingdom: Animalia
- Phylum: Chordata
- Class: Reptilia
- Order: Squamata
- Suborder: Serpentes
- Infraorder: Alethinophidia; Nopcsa, 1923

Subclades
- Afrophidia; Amerophidia

= Alethinophidia =

Alethinophidia Temporal range: 94–0 Ma Cenomanian to Present

Clade of snakes

Common names: advanced snakes.

The Alethinophidia are an infraorder of snakes that includes all snakes other than blind snakes and thread snakes. Snakes have long been grouped into families within Alethinophidia based on their morphology, especially that of their teeth. More modern phylogenetic hypotheses using genetic data support the recognition of 19 extant families (see below), although the taxonomy of alethinophidian snakes has long been debated, and ultimately the decision whether to assign a particular clade to a particular Linnaean rank (such as a superfamily, family, or subfamily) is arbitrary.

== Etymology ==
The infraorder name Alethinophidia derives from the two Ancient Greek words ἀληθινός (alēthinós), meaning "truthful, genuine", and ὄφις (óphis), meaning "snake".

== Fossil record ==
Fossils of alethinophidians were found in Cenomanian (Middle Cretaceous) sites of Wadi Milk Formation in Wadi Abu Hashim, Sudan. Coniophis presents the vertebral morphology similar to modern-day Aniliidae. Two extinct families from the same location, the Anomalophiidae and Russellophiidae, also belong to the Alethinophidia. Krebsophis is the earliest russellophiid. The family Nigerophiidae includes both aquatic Nubianophis from Wadi Abu Hashim and Nigerophis from the Palaeocene of Niger. The genus Eoanilius (belongs to Aniliidae) appeared in the Eocene. It is also existed in Oligocene and early Miocene. The extinct marine Simoliophidae are known from the Cenomanian of North Africa, the Middle East, and Eastern Europe, indicating a Tethyan distribution; they are notable for preserving evidence of vestigial hindlimbs.

== Systematics ==
=== Extant taxa ===
- Clade Amerophidia
  - Family: Aniliidae Stejneger, 1907—red pipesnake
  - Family: Tropidophiidae Brongersma, 1951—Caribbean dwarf "boas" or thunder snakes
- Superfamily Booidea
  - Family: Boidae Gray, 1825—boas (see article for comments on former families or subfamilies Calabariidae/inae, Sanziniidae/inae, Charinidae/inae, Erycidae/inae, Candoiidae/inae)
- Superfamily Pythonoidea
  - Family: Pythonidae Fitzinger, 1826—pythons
  - Family: Loxocemidae Cope, 1861—Mexican burrowing pythons
  - Family: Xenopeltidae Bonaparte, 1845—sunbeam snakes
- Superfamily Uropeltoidea
  - Family: Uropeltidae Müller, 1832—shield-tailed snakes
  - Family: Cylindrophiidae Fitzinger, 1843—Asian pipe snakes
  - Family: Anomochilidae Cundall, Wallach and Rossman, 1993—dwarf pipe snakes
- Family: Bolyeriidae Hoffstetter, 1946—Splitjaw snakes
- Family: Xenophidiidae Wallach & Günther, 1998—Spine-jawed snakes
- Family: Acrochordidae Bonaparte, 1831—wart or file snakes
- Family: Xenodermidae Oppel, 1811—odd-scaled snakes
- Family: Pareidae Oppel, 1811—snail-eating snakes
- Family: Viperidae Oppel, 1811—vipers (including pit vipers)
  - Subfamily: Azemiopinae Liem, Marx and Rabb, 1971—Fea's viper
  - Subfamily: Crotalinae Oppel, 1811—pitvipers (including rattlesnakes)
  - Subfamily: Viperinae Oppel, 1811—true vipers
- Family: Homalopsidae Günther, 1864—Asian mudsnakes
- Superfamily: Elapoidea F. Boie, 1827 (merged with Colubroidea by the Reptile Database)
  - Family: Cyclocoridae Weinell & Brown, 2017—Philippine snakes
  - Family: Micrelapidae Das et al., 2023—two-headed snakes
  - Family: Elapidae F. Boie, 1827—Cobras, coral snakes, mambas, taipans, sea snakes, and others
  - Family: Pseudaspididae Cope, 1893—mole snake, western keeled snake, and mock vipers
  - Family: Prosymnidae Gray, 1849—shovel-snouted snakes
  - Family: Psammophiidae Dowling, 1967—sand snakes and allies
  - Family: Atractaspididae Günther, 1858—African burrowing asps, stiletto snakes, harlequin snakes
  - Family: Pseudoxyrhophiidae Dowling, 1975—Malagasy hognose snakes, brook snakes, and allies
  - Family: Lamprophiidae Fitzinger, 1843—lamprophiids
- Superfamily: Colubroidea Oppel, 1811
  - Family: Colubridae Oppel, 1811—colubrids, typical snakes (subfamilies sometimes considered distinct families)
    - Subfamily: Sibynophiinae Dunn, 1928—hinged-teeth snakes
    - Subfamily: Natricinae Bonaparte, 1838—keelbacks
    - Subfamily: Pseudoxenodontinae McDowell, 1987
    - Subfamily: Dipsadinae Bonaparte, 1838

=== Fossil taxa ===
Based on Gower & Zaher (2022):

- Genus †Afrotortrix Rage, 2021
- Genus †Amaru Albino, 2018
- Genus †Cerberophis Longrich et al., 2012
- Genus †Eoanilius Rage, 1974
- Genus †Falseryx Szyndlar & Rage, 2003
- Genus †Goinophis Holman, 1976
- Genus †Hoffstetterella Rage, 1998
- Genus †Katariana Deshmukh et al., 2022
- Genus †Parapalaeophis Natarajan & Klompmaker, 2026
- Genus †Platyspondylia Rage, 1974
- Genus †Rottophis Szyndlar & Bohme, 1996
- Genus †Szyndlaria Rage & Auge, 2010
- Genus †Tuscahomaophis Holman & Case, 1992
- Genus †Vectophis Rage & Ford, 1980
- Family †Simoliophidae Nopsca, 1925
- Family †Palaeophiidae Lydekker, 1888
- Family †Nigerophiidae Rage, 1975

== See also ==
- Scolecophidia, blind snakes, thread snakes.
- List of snakes, overview of all snake genera.
