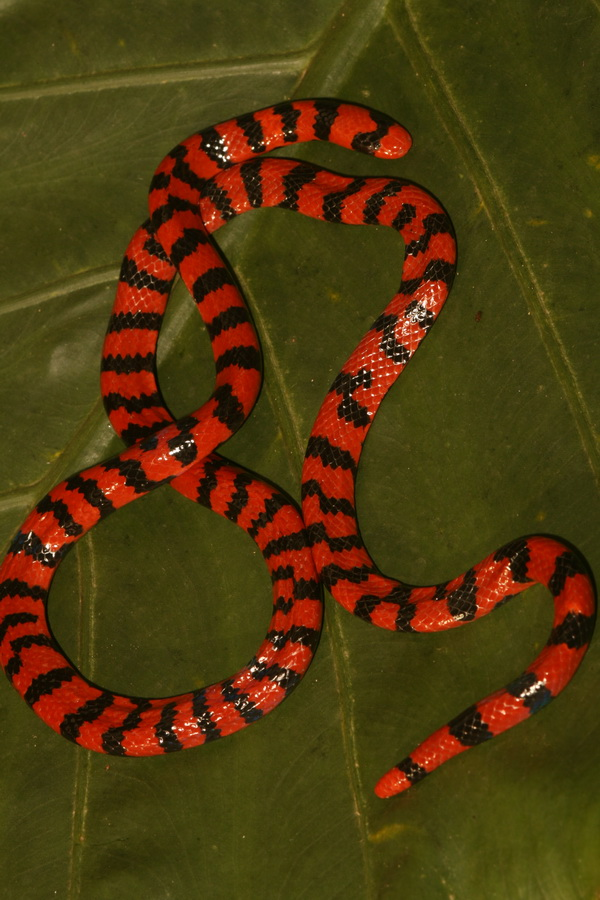

Scientific classification
- Kingdom: Animalia
- Phylum: Chordata
- Class: Reptilia
- Order: Squamata
- Suborder: Serpentes
- Infraorder: Alethinophidia
- Clade: Amerophidia
- Family: Aniliidae; Stejneger, 1907
- Genus: Anilius; Oken, 1816
- Species: A. scytale

Binomial name
- Anilius scytale (Linnaeus, 1758)
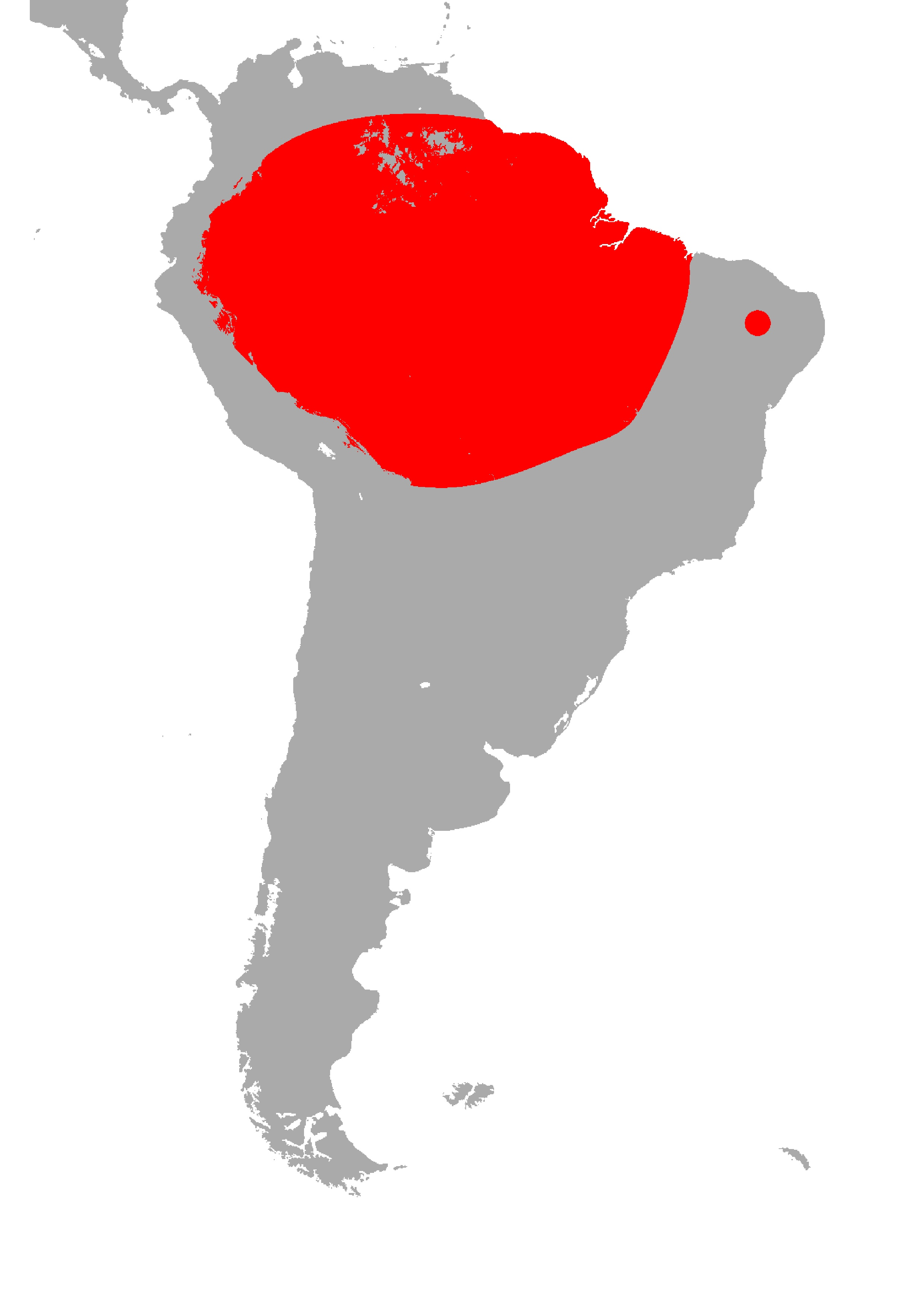

Synonyms
- List: Ilysioidea - Fitzinger, 1826; Tortricina - Müller, 1823; Tortricidae - Jan, 1863; Ilysiidae - Boulenger, 1890; Aniliidae - Stejneger, 1907; Anilidae - Amaral, 1930; Aniliinae - Romer, 1956; Tortrix - Oppel, 1811; Anilius - Oken, 1816; Elysia - Hemprich, 1820; Helison - Brazil, Ilysia - Lichtenstein, 1823; Torquatrix - Haworth, 1825; Illisia - Schinz, 1883; Anileus - Agassiz, 1844; [Anguis] Scytale Linnaeus, 1758; Anguis annulata Laurenti, 1768; Anguis fasciata Laurenti, 1768; Anguis caerulae Laurenti, 1768; Anguis corallina Laurenti, 1768; Anguis atra Laurenti, 1768; [Anguis] ater — Gmelin, 1788; Anguis Corallinus — Schneider, 1801; Anguis fasciatus — Schneider, 1801; Anguis ruber Latreille In Sonnini & Latreille, 1801; Tortr[ix]. scytale — Oppel, 1811; Tortr[ix]. coralinus [sic] Oppel, 1811 (ex errore); Anilius scytale — Oken, 1816; [Tortrix] annulata — Merrem, 1820; Anguis (Elysia) Scytale — Hemprich, 1820; Ilysia scytale — Lichtenstein, 1823; Torquatrix scytale — Gray, 1825; Tortrix scytale — A.M.C. Duméril & Bibron, 1844; Ilysia scytale — Boulenger, 1893; A[nilius]. scytale [scylate] [sic] Roze, 1958 (ex errore); Anilius scytale scytale — J. Peters & Orejas-Miranda, 1970

= Anilius =

Genus of snakes

The Aniliidae are a monotypic family created for the monotypic genus Anilius that contains the single species Anilius scytale. Common names include the American pipe snake and false coral snake. It is found in South America. This snake possesses a vestigial pelvic girdle that is visible as a pair of cloacal spurs. It is ovoviviparous. It is non-venomous, and its diet consists mainly of amphibians and other reptiles. Two subspecies are recognized, including the nominate subspecies described here.

== Description ==
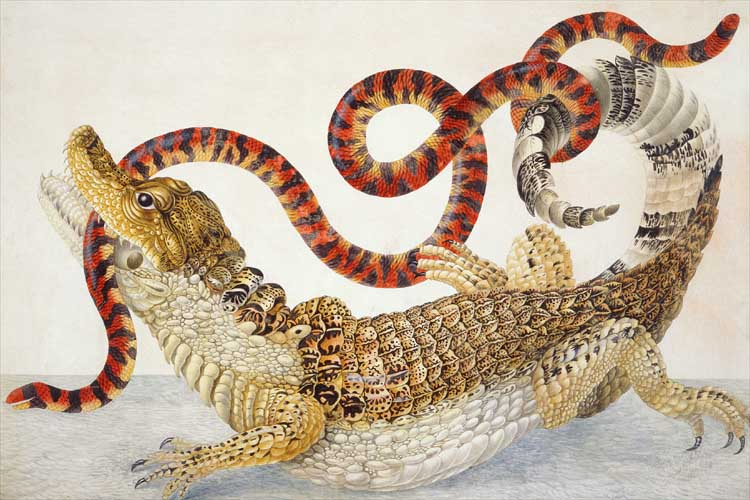
Spectacled caiman and false coral snake by Maria Sibylla Merian

This species is found in the Amazon rainforest of South America, the Guianas, and Trinidad and Tobago. It is a moderate-sized snake attaining a size of about 70 cm (28 in) in length. It is fossorial and is rarely seen. It is reported to be ovoviviparous and feeds on beetles, caecilians (burrowing legless amphibians), amphisbaenids or worm lizards (legless lizards), small fossorial snakes, fish (particularly swamp eels), and frogs. It forages for food on the ground, and sometimes in the water, at night. It has a cylindrical body of uniform diameter and a very short tail; it is brightly banded in red and black and its reduced eyes lie beneath large head scales. It is considered to be the snake that most resembles the original and ancestral snake condition, such as a lizard-like skull.

== Geographic range ==
It is found in the tropics of northern South America from southern and eastern Venezuela, Guyana, Suriname and French Guiana south through the Amazon Basin of Colombia, Ecuador, Peru, and Brazil. The type locality given is "Indiis".

== Subspecies ==
Subspecies	Taxon author	Common name	Geographic range
A. s. phelpsorum	Roze, 1958		
A. s. scytale	(Linnaeus, 1758)		

== Taxonomy ==
Modern classifications restrict the family to the South American pipe snake or false coral snake (Anilius scytale), with the previously included Asian genus Cylindrophis raised to a separate family, Cylindrophiidae. Anilius is not closely related to Asian pipesnakes. Instead, its closest relatives appear to be the neotropical Tropidophiidae.
