= Mary Cynthia Dickerson =

American herpetologist and magazine editor

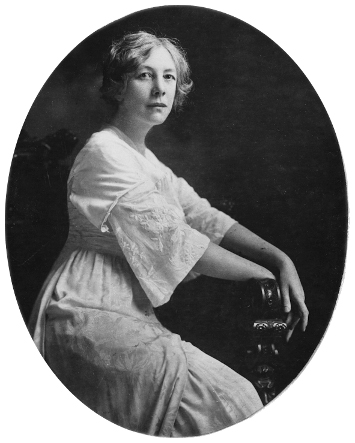
- Dickerson circa 1912
- Born: March 7, 1866; Hastings, Michigan
- Died: April 23, 1923 (aged 57); New York City
- Education: University of Chicago; University of Michigan
- Scientific career
- Fields: Herpetology
- Workplaces: American Museum of Natural History

Mary Cynthia Dickerson (March 7, 1866 – April 23, 1923) was an American herpetologist and the first curator of herpetology at the American Museum of Natural History, as well as the first curator in the now defunct department of Woods and Forestry. For ten years she was the editor of The American Museum Journal, which was renamed Natural History during her editorship. She published two books: Moths and Butterflies (1901) and The Frog Book (1906) as well as numerous popular and scientific articles. She described over 20 species of reptiles and is commemorated in the scientific names of four lizards.

== Early life and career ==
Mary Cynthia Dickerson was born in Hastings, Michigan, on March 7, 1866 to parents Wilbur and Melissa Dickerson. In her early life she cared for her three small brothers. In a memorial, Maud Slye wrote "She put herself through college at a time when it was not easy for a girl to do this." She attended the University of Michigan from 1886 to 1887 and from 1889 to 1891, after which she taught high school biology in Grand Rapids, Michigan and Illinois from 1891 to 1895. She then attended the University of Chicago, earning a Bachelor of Science in 1897. From 1897 to 1905 she was head of zoology and botany at Rhode Island Normal School, where she led students on nature walks in Providence and collected observations for her books Moths and Butterflies (1901) and The Frog Book (1906). In 1905, she donated 460 frog specimens from her research to the American Museum of Natural History.

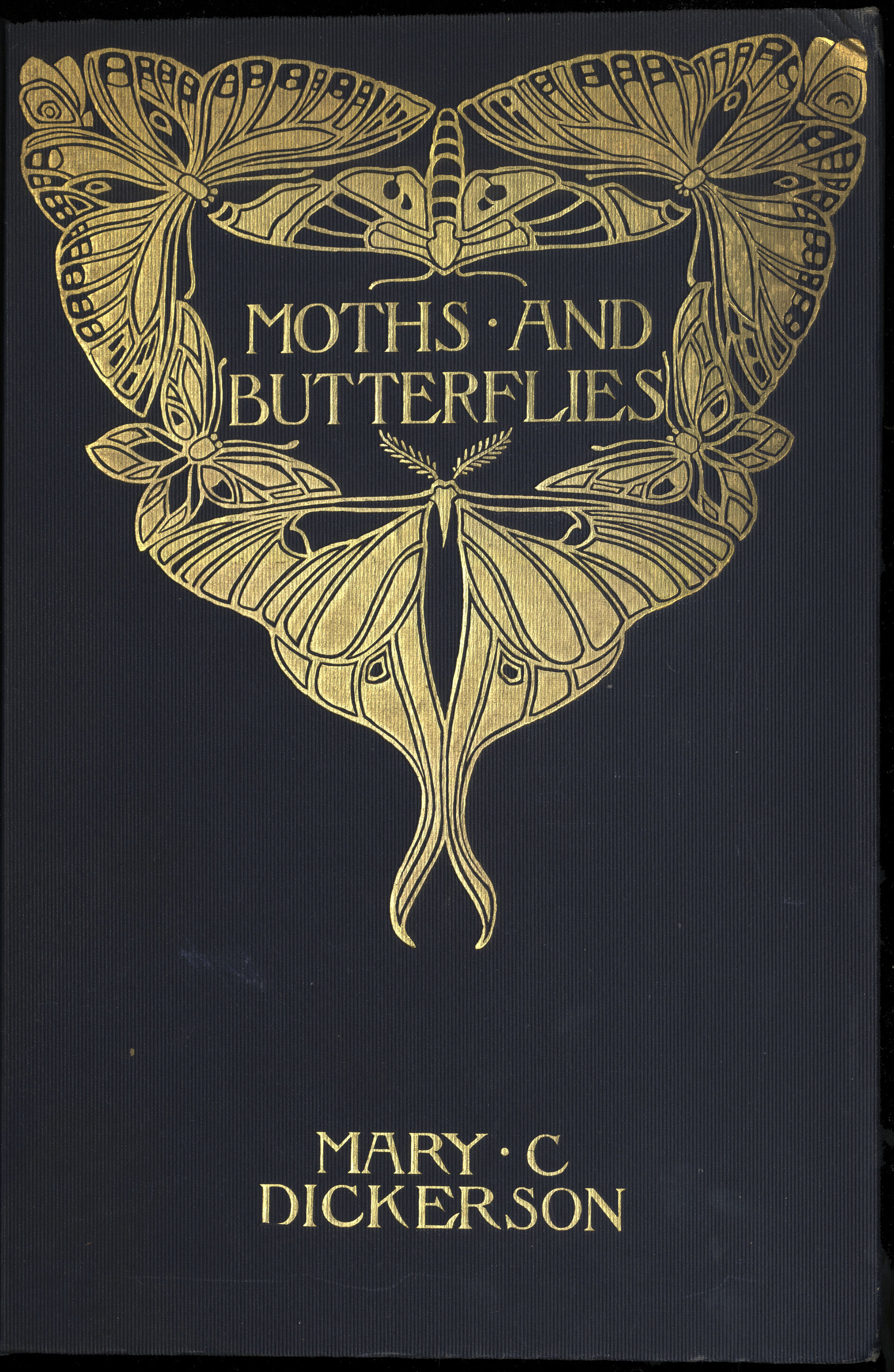
Cover to Moths and Butterflies

Moths and Butterflies, illustrated with Dickerson's photographs, was well received. A reviewer for The American Naturalist opened "This is really an excellent book, both in conception and in execution." A review in the Journal of Education stated "This work must, simply on the ground of merit, be placed in the front rank of nature studies... Not only is its descriptive matter free from everything like pedantry and professionalism, but the illustrations fairly make the study eloquent." A mixed review by the American Journal of Psychology wrote Dickerson "has the fatal error of the pedagogue that the number of topics and range must be sacrificed to thoroughness of method. Happily, however, she does not carry this principle, which has trivialized so many text books, so far as to interfere with the really great merit of her book."

The Frog Book, published in 1906, explored the frogs and toads of North America. "For many years amateur naturalists and nature-study teachers have been asking for a popular reference book on our common amphibians" wrote a reviewer in The Independent, "However, the need of a popular frog book is now well met". A reviewer for Science wrote: "Not only are the habits of the common frogs well portrayed, but the eggs and tadpoles are figured, as has not been done before". A more mixed review for The Nature Study Review writes "the work is more than interesting, it is quite accurate and very usable," but notes "the life-histories are a disappointment from the viewpoint of the scientist. It would seem that the 'ten years of observation and study' to which the author confesses should have furnished more accurate data on such fundamental points as breeding seasons, number of eggs laid, quantity and kinds of food, etc."

From 1907 to 1908 she was an instructor at Stanford University, where she co-authored three papers with ichthyologist David Starr Jordan, including the description of a new species of halfbeak. She began working at the American Museum of Natural History in November 1908, and spent the remainder of her career at the institution.

== American Museum of Natural History ==
At the American Museum, Dickerson was first hired as an assistant in the department of Woods and Forestry, where one of her early publications was a 104 page guide to the forestry hall. She was appointed to curator in 1911. In July 1909, a Department of Ichthyology and Herpetology was formally established by the Museum, with Dickerson as the sole herpetologist alongside ichthyologists Bashford Dean, John Treadwell Nichols, and Louis Hussakof. In November 1909, Dickerson became associate editor of The American Museum Journal and became editor the following year, a position she held until 1920. She conducted some field work in Arizona and Massachusetts in 1912, before turning her attention to the development of the Herpetology Department into a leading research and exhibition group.

Dickerson promoted the growth of the herpetological collections, and was known for her lifelike amphibian and reptile dioramas or "groups". She attracted a trio of notable herpetologists to the American Museum: Karl Patterson Schmidt, Gladwyn Kingsley Noble, and Charles Lewis Camp. She also attempted to recruit another promising herpetologist, Emmett Reid Dunn, to the museum in 1917, after funding Dunn's early expeditions to the Appalachian Mountains. Under Dickerson's direction, the herpetology collections grew to nearly 50,000 specimens. In February, 1920, herpetology was separated from ichthyology and a new Department of Herpetology was formally created, with Dickerson as its first curator. She was a member of the American Academy of Arts and Sciences, American Forestry Association, American Ornithologists' Union, and the New York Academy of Sciences. Dickerson considered exhibition work to be of equal importance to research and she developed the concept of herpetological "habitat groups" by employing a variety of preparation techniques, most notably wax casting to create life like models and create a more integrated exhibit.

Dickerson described over 20 new species of reptiles, including the San Esteban chuckwalla and the Cuban sharp-nosed amphisbaena. She is commemorated in the names of four lizard species or subspecies: Cnemaspis dickersonae, Aspidoscelis tigris dickersonae, Holbrookia maculata dickersonae, and Crotaphytus dickersonae.

By 1920, Dickerson had accomplished something remarkable. Despite other truly heavy responsibilities, she had built a functioning department from scratch, emphasizing collection growth and literature facilities in order to support the twin functions of exhibition and research in herpetology.

— Charles W. Myers, Curator Emeritus, American Museum of Natural History

== Later years ==
By around 1919, Dickerson was showing signs of mental disturbance, attributed to the stress of holding dual curatorial and editorial duties. Her behavior became erratic, and she experienced auditory hallucinations of the Arctic explorer Vilhjalmur Stefansson, an associate of the Museum, to whom she wrote several letters indicative of mental disturbance. Dickerson attempted to lessen her duties at the museum by resigning as the Natural History editor on June 5, 1920. Henry Fairfield Osborn, the president of the museum, refused to accept her resignation, instead pressuring her to take time off work, which she refused. In November 1920, she was removed from the museum after a medical evaluation and placed in the custody of her brother. She re-appeared at the museum on December 10, acting peculiarly, and was taken to a hospital for observation. On December 24, she was committed to a psychiatric institution on Wards Island, where she spent the rest of her life, dying at the age of 57 on April 8, 1923.
