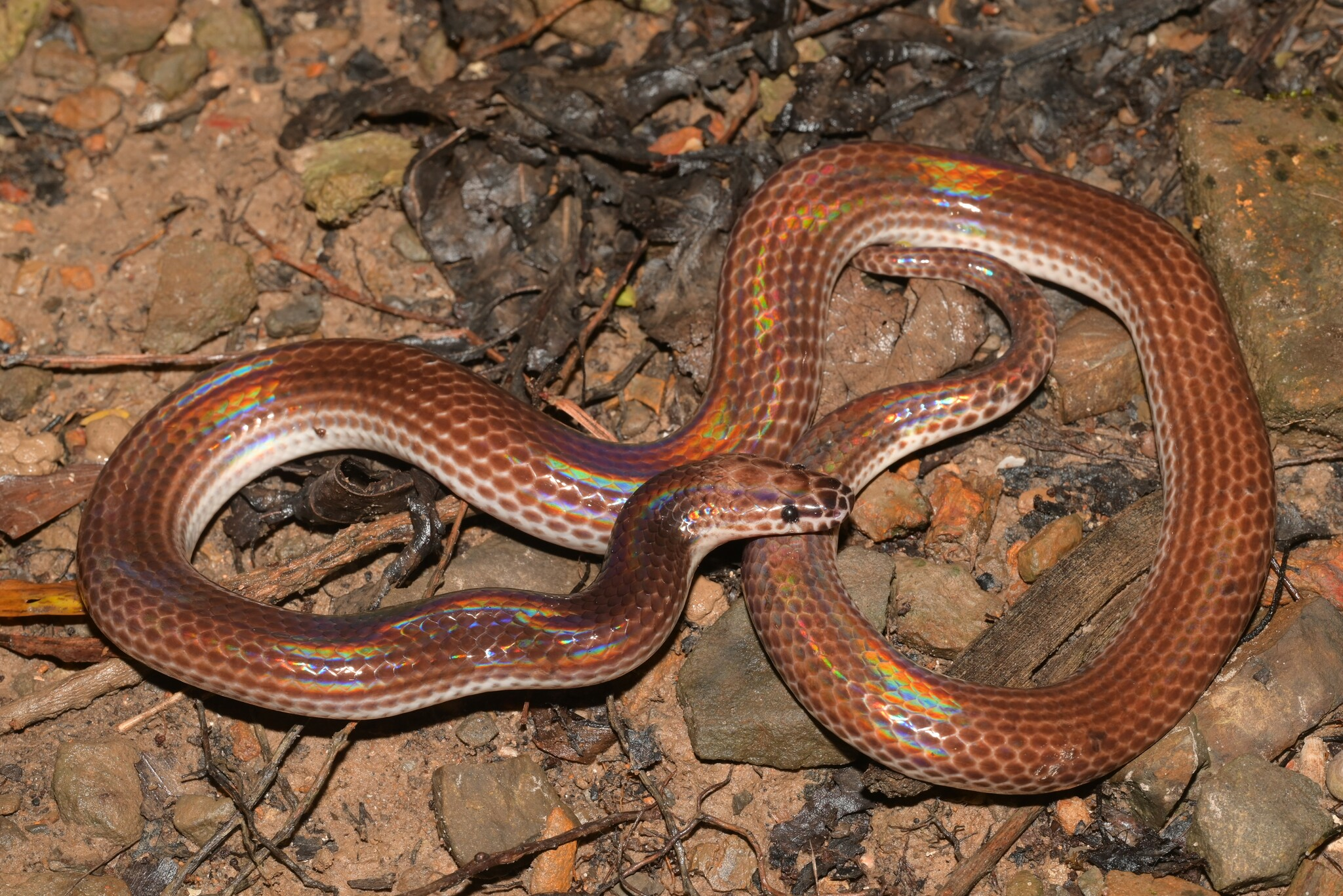
- Xenopeltis unicolor in Malaysia

Conservation status
- Least Concern (IUCN 3.1)

Scientific classification
- Kingdom: Animalia
- Phylum: Chordata
- Class: Reptilia
- Order: Squamata
- Suborder: Serpentes
- Family: Xenopeltidae
- Genus: Xenopeltis
- Species: X. unicolor

Binomial name
- Xenopeltis unicolor Reinwardt, 1827

Synonyms
- Col[uber]. alvearius F. Boie, 1826; [Xenopeltis] unicolor Reinwardt In F. Boie, 1827; [Xenopeltis] concolor Reinwardt In F. Boie, 1827; Xenopeltis leucocephala Reinwardt In F. Boie, 1827; Tortrix xenopeltis Schlegel, 1837; Xenopeltis unicolor — Cantor, 1847; X[enopeltis]. leucocephalus — Jan & Sordelli, 1865; Xenopeltis unicolor — Boulenger, 1893

= Xenopeltis unicolor =

Species of snake

Xenopeltis unicolor, commonly known as the sunbeam snake, common sunbeam snake or iridescent snake, is a non-venomous sunbeam snake species found in Southeast Asia and some regions of Indonesia. This is a primitive snake known for both its highly iridescent scales and its ability to reproduce quickly, as it is oviparous and as such can lay up to 10 eggs at a time. No subspecies are currently recognized.

== Description ==
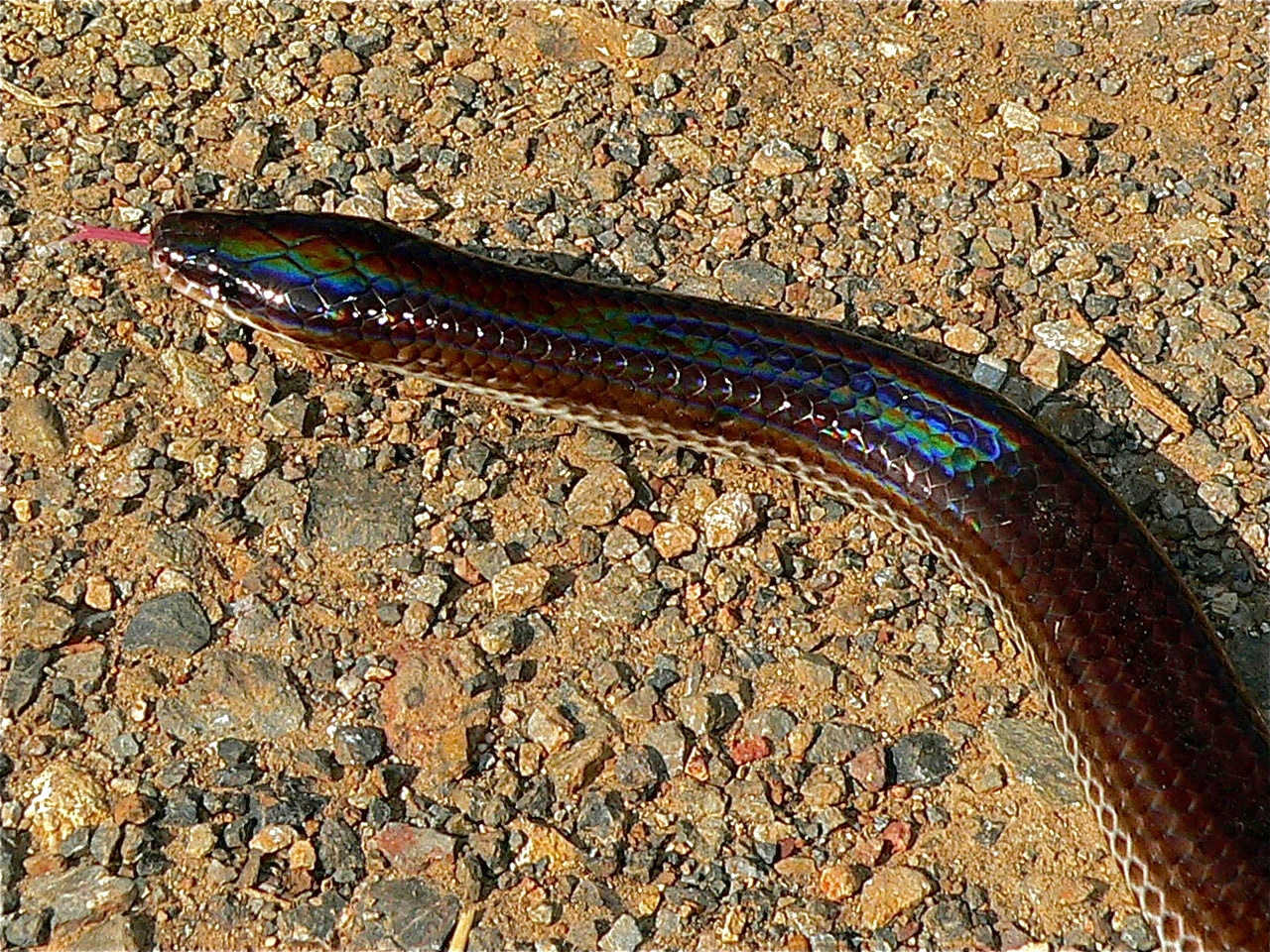
Khao Yai National Park, Thailand

Grows to an average of about 1 m (3 ft 3 in). The color is reddish brown, brown or blackish with an unpatterned withish-grey venter. A fossorial species, the head is wedge-shaped and narrow with little neck delineation, which makes it easy to push through the soil. Its most defining characteristic is its iridescent, highly polished scales that give this snake its common name. They have a layer of dark pigmentation just below the surface on each scale that enhances the iridescence. The young look very similar to the adults, except that they have a strong white "collar" of scales evident just below the head. This coloration fades within the first year. They have two cone opsins allowing for the potential of dichromatic color vision.

Xenopeltis unicolor has two postocular scales, supralabial formula 3-2-3, 181 – 196 ventrals, and 26 – 31 pairs of subcaudals.

This is a primitive form of snake with both boid and python characteristics; which family it belongs to is still a matter of debate.

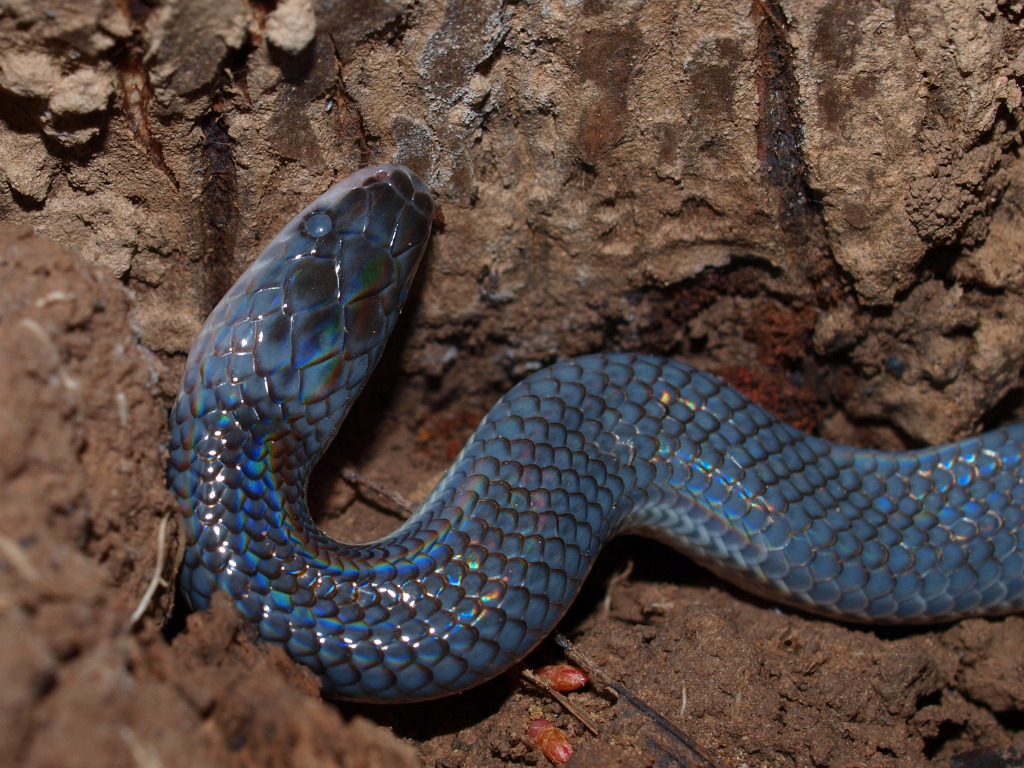
This closeup clearly shows the characteristic iridescent highly polished scales.

== Geographic range ==
Found in China (Guangdong and Yunnan), Myanmar, the Andaman and Nicobar Islands, Vietnam, Laos, Cambodia, Thailand, West Malaysia, Penang Island, Singapore Island, East Malaysia (Sarawak), Indonesia (the Riau Archipelago, Bangka, Billiton, Sumatra, We, Simalur, Nias, the Mentawai Islands (Siberut), Borneo, Java and Sulawesi) and the Philippines (Balabac, Bongao, Jolo and Palawan). The type locality given is "Java".

== Habitat ==
Tends to live in open areas such as forest clearings, gardens and parks. Often encountered in rice paddies.

These snakes are found in monsoon and rain forests, on the rice fields and gardens adjacent to residential houses; prefer the sites of the forests in the valleys of mountain streams with outcrops of the rocks and numerous hollows under the piles of stones.

== Behaviour ==
These snake are constrictors, killing their prey by suffocation in their muscular coils. They are fossorial and spend most of their time below ground. They may bite readily if handled roughly, but mostly just try to escape if picked up. They are also observed to vibrate their tails in a rattlesnake-like fashion when they feel threatened.

== Feeding ==
The diet is varied, consisting primarily of frogs, reptiles, including other snakes, and small mammals.

== Reproduction ==
Oviparous, with females laying up to 10 eggs at a time, but nests with 17 and 18 eggs have been observed.
