= Nicolaus Michael Oppel =

German naturalist

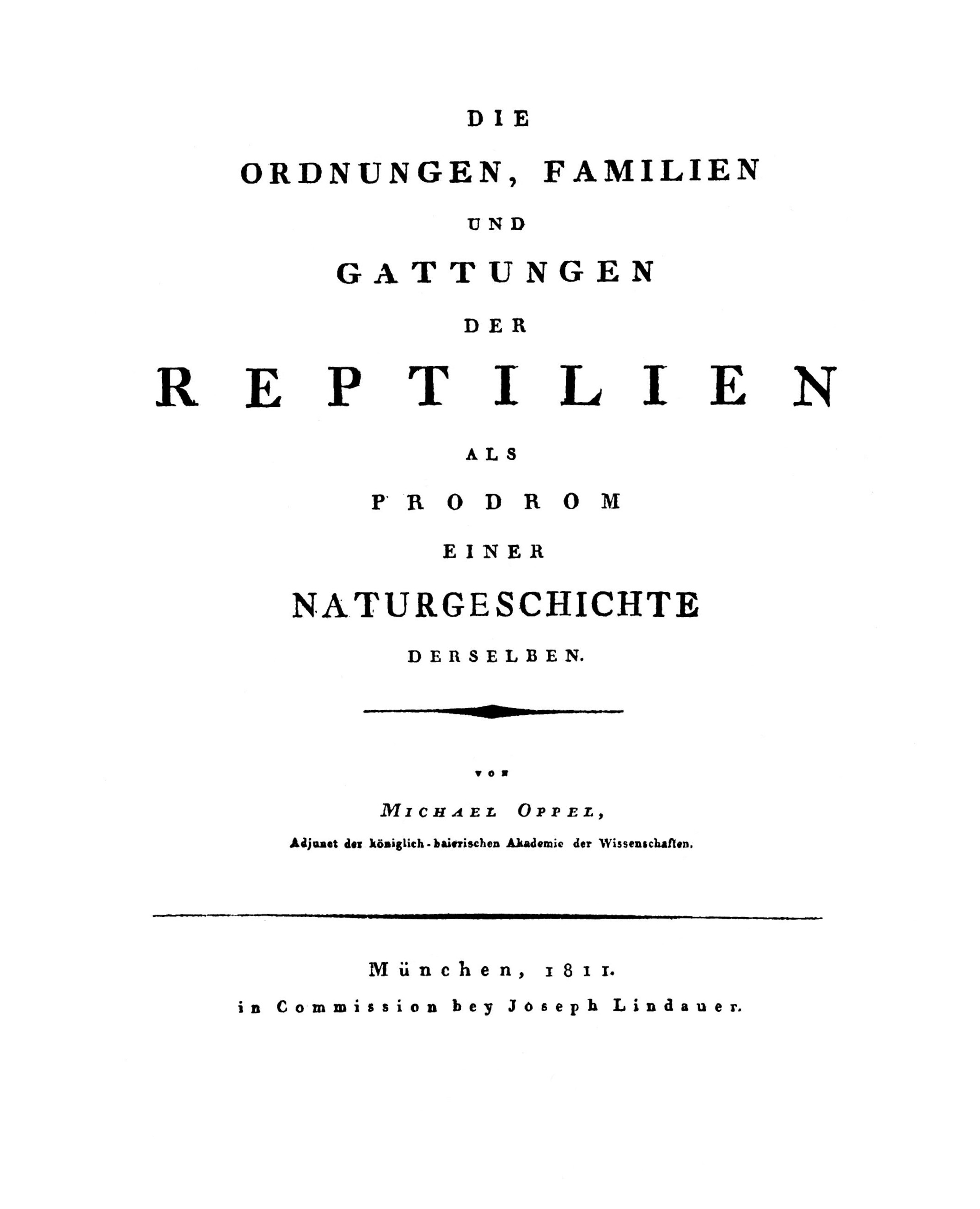
- Born: 7 December 1782
- Died: 16 February 1820 (aged 37)
- Scientific career
- Fields: Herpetology

Nicolaus Michael Oppel (December 7, 1782 in Schönficht – February 16, 1820 in Munich) was a German naturalist.

He was a student of, and worked as an assistant to, André Marie Constant Duméril (1774-1860) at the Muséum national d'histoire naturelle in Paris, France, cataloging and classifying species of reptiles. In 1811, he published a book entitled Die Ordnungen, Familien und Gattungen der Reptilien als Prodrom einer Naturgeschichte derselben, or "The Orders, Families, and Types of Reptiles..." in which he established the order, Squamata, and the families Cheloniidae, Colubridae, and the subfamily Crotalinae, as well as several genera which are still in use by taxonomists today.

With Friedrich Tiedemann (1781-1861) and Joseph Liboschitz (1783-1824), he was co-author of Naturgeschichte der Amphibien (Natural history of amphibians).
