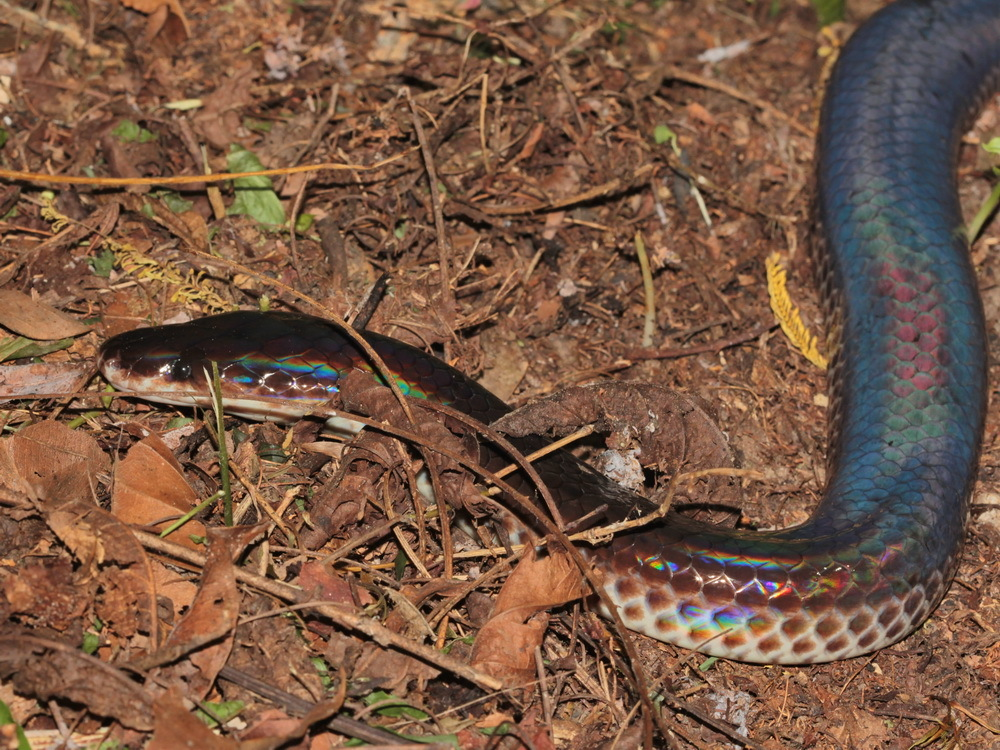
- Sunbeam snake (X. unicolor)

Scientific classification
- Kingdom: Animalia
- Phylum: Chordata
- Class: Reptilia
- Order: Squamata
- Suborder: Serpentes
- Family: Xenopeltidae; Bonaparte, 1845
- Genus: Xenopeltis; Reinwardt, 1827

Synonyms
- Family: Scaptophes Fitzinger, 1843; Xenopeltina Bonaparte, 184S; Tortricidae Jan, 1863; Xenopeltidae Cope, 1864; Xenopeltinae Nopcsa, 1928; Genus: Xenopeltis F. Boie, 1826; Xenopeltis — Reinwardt In F. Boie, 1827

= Xenopeltis =

Genus of snakes

Xenopeltis, the sunbeam snakes, are the sole genus of the monotypic family Xenopeltidae, the species of which are found in Southeast Asia. Sunbeam snakes are known for their highly iridescent scales. Three species are recognized, each one with no subspecies. Studies of DNA suggest that the xenopeltids are most closely related to the Mexican burrowing python (Loxocemus bicolor) and to the true pythons (Pythonidae).

== Description ==
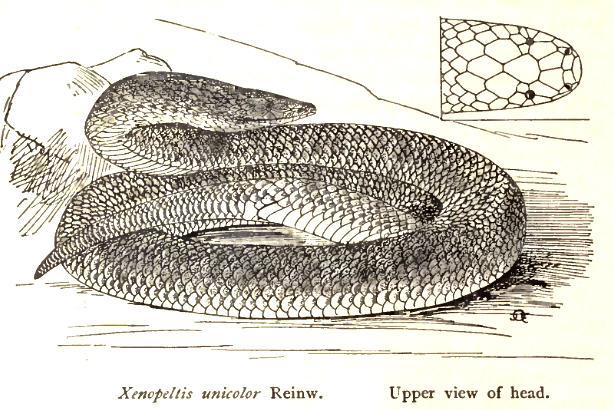
Illustration of Xenopeltis unicolor

Adults can grow up to 1.3 m (51 in) in length. The head scales are made up of large plates much like those of the Colubridae, while the ventral scales are only slightly reduced. Pelvic vestiges are not present.

The dorsal color pattern is a reddish-brown, brown, or blackish color. The belly is an unpatterned whitish-gray. The scales are highly iridescent.

== Geographic range ==
They are found in Southeast Asia from the Andaman and Nicobar Islands, east through Myanmar to southern China, Thailand, Laos, Cambodia, Vietnam, the Malay Peninsula and the East Indies to Sulawesi, as well as the Philippines.

== Behavior and diet ==
These snakes are fossorial, spending much of their time hidden. They emerge at dusk to actively forage for frogs, other snakes, and small mammals. They are not venomous, and kill their prey with constriction.

== Species ==
Species	Taxon author	Common name	Geographic range
X. hainanensis	Hu & Zhao, 1972		China: from Zhejiang west to Guangxi and south to Hainan Island
X. intermedius	Orlov, Snetkov., Ermakov, Nguyen, & Ananjeva, 2022		Vietnam
X. unicolor^{T}	Reinwardt, 1827	common sunbeam snake	Myanmar (Tenasserim), the Andaman and Nicobar Islands, southern China (Guangdong and Yunnan), Thailand, Laos, Cambodia, Vietnam, West Malaysia, Penang Island, Singapore Island and East Malaysia (Sarawak); in Indonesia, it is found on the islands of the Riau Archipelago, Bangka, Belitung, Sumatra, We, Simalur, Nias, the Mentawai Islands (Siberut), Borneo, Java, and Sulawesi; in the Philippines, it is found on the islands of Balabac, Bongao, Jolo and Palawan

^{T}) Type species.

== Captivity ==
These snakes are not very commonly kept as pets because of their high mortality rate in captivity. Shipping and the first six months in captivity are very stressful and often kill captive snakes. They also have very little tolerance of handling, with the resulting stress leading to premature death. Captive specimens should be provided with a temperature gradient and an easy to burrow substrate. The cage should be kept warm, but not hot, and they should be left alone.
