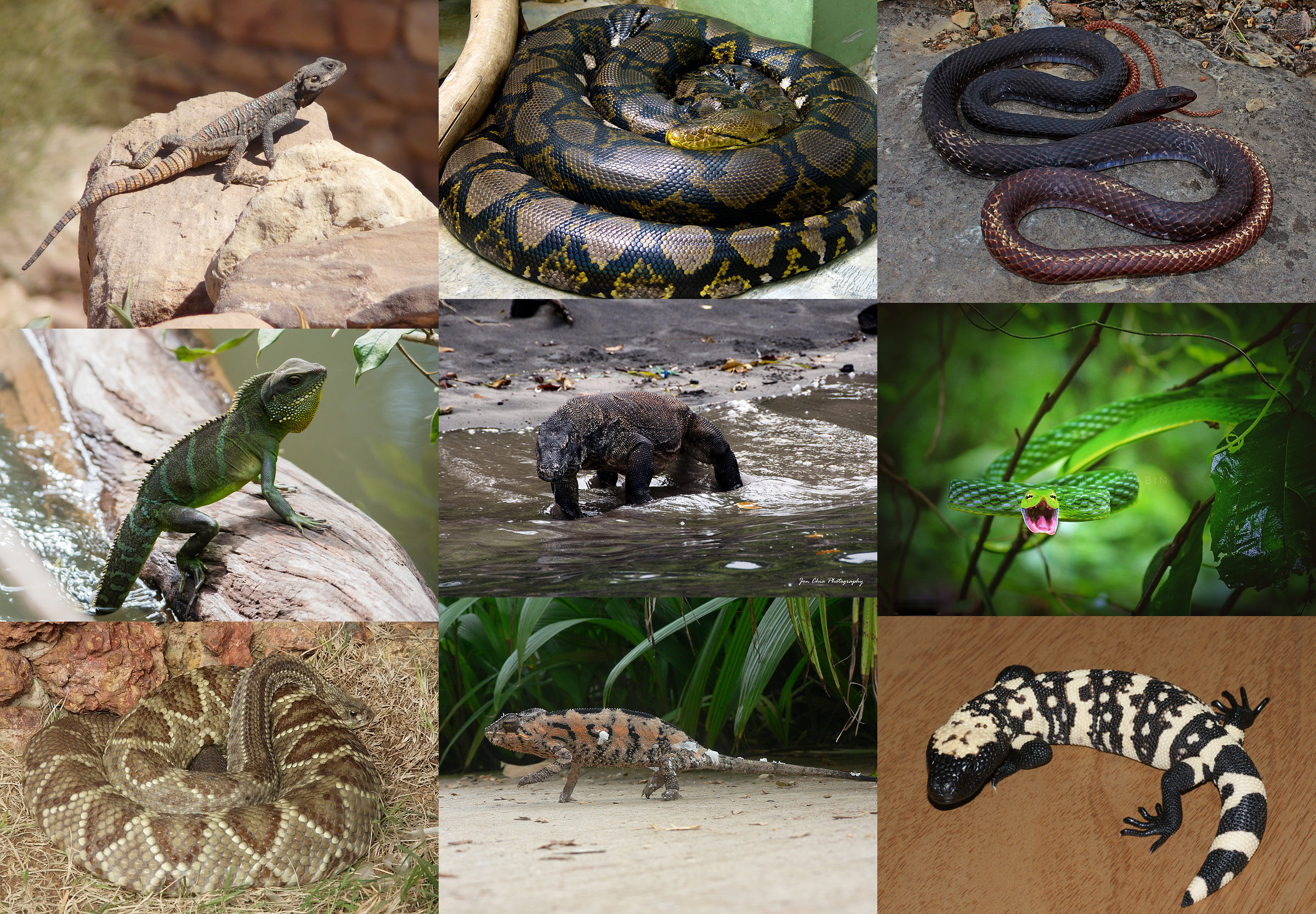

Scientific classification
- Kingdom: Animalia
- Phylum: Chordata
- Class: Reptilia
- Superorder: Lepidosauria
- Order: Squamata; Oppel, 1811

Subgroups
- Dibamia (blind skinks); Gekkota (geckos); Scincomorpha; Lacertoidea; Toxicofera; Anguimorpha; Iguania; Serpentes (snakes); †Mosasauria

= Squamata =

Squamates Temporal range: Bathonian–Present

Order of reptiles

Squamata (/skwæˈmeɪtə/, Latin squamatus, 'scaly, having scales') is the largest order of reptiles; most members are commonly known as lizards, with the group also including snakes. With over 11,991 species, it is also the second-largest order of extant (living) vertebrates, after the perciform fish. Squamates are distinguished by their skins, which bear horny scales or shields, and periodically undergo molting. They also possess movable quadrate bones, making possible movement of the upper jaw relative to the neurocranium. This is particularly visible in snakes, which are able to open their mouths very widely to accommodate comparatively large prey. Squamates are the most variably sized living reptiles, ranging from the 16 mm (0.63 in) dwarf gecko (Sphaerodactylus ariasae) to the 6.5 m (21 ft) reticulated python (Malayopython reticulatus). The extinct mosasaurs reached lengths over 14 m (46 ft).

Among other reptiles, squamates are most closely related to the tuatara, the last surviving member of the once diverse Rhynchocephalia, with both groups being placed in the superorder Lepidosauria.

== Evolution ==
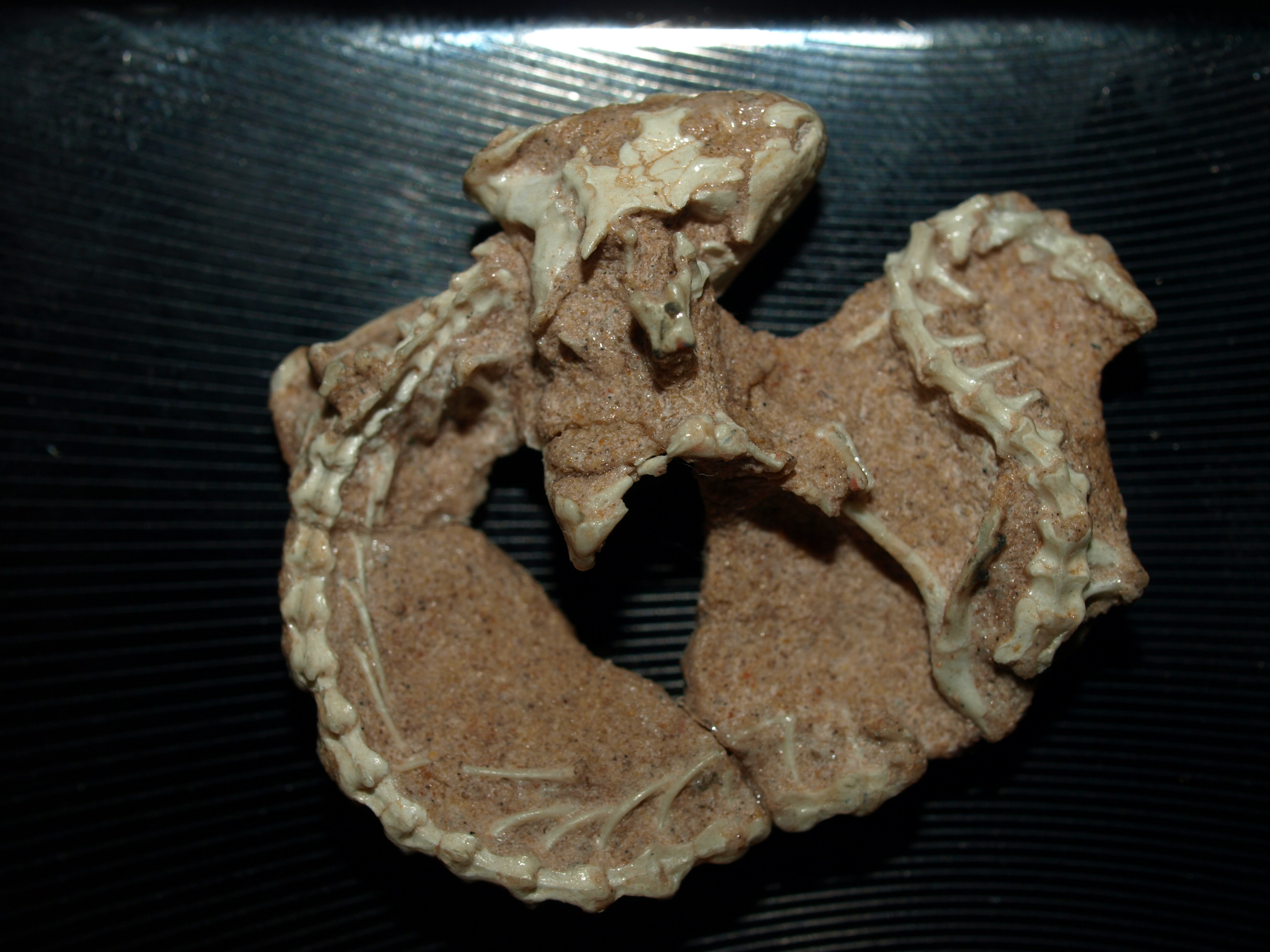
The holotype of Slavoia darevskii, a fossil squamate

Squamates are a monophyletic sister group to the rhynchocephalians, members of the order Rhynchocephalia. The only surviving member of the Rhynchocephalia is the tuatara. Squamata and Rhynchocephalia form the superorder Lepidosauria, which is the sister group to the Archosauria, the clade that contains crocodiles and birds, and their extinct relatives. Fossils of rhynchocephalians first appear in the Early Triassic, meaning that the lineage leading to squamates must have also existed at the time.

A study in 2018 found that Megachirella, an extinct genus of lepidosaurs that lived about 240 million years ago during the Middle Triassic, was a stem-squamate, making it the oldest known squamate. The phylogenetic analysis was conducted by performing high-resolution microfocus X-ray computed tomography (micro-CT) scans on the fossil specimen of Megachirella to gather detailed data about its anatomy. These data were then compared with a phylogenetic dataset combining the morphological and molecular data of 129 extant and extinct reptilian taxa. The comparison revealed Megachirella had certain features that are unique to squamates. The study also found that geckos are the earliest crown group squamates, not iguanians. However, a 2021 study found the genus to be a lepidosaur of uncertain position, in a polytomy with Squamata and Rhynchocephalia.

In 2022, the extinct genus Cryptovaranoides was described from the Late Triassic (Rhaetian age) of England as a highly derived squamate belonging to the group Anguimorpha, which contains many extant lineages such as monitor lizards, beaded lizards and anguids. The presence of an essentially modern crown group squamate so far back in time was unexpected, as their diversification was previously thought to have occurred during the Jurassic and Cretaceous. In 2023, Brownstein and colleagues study found that Cryptovaranoides most likely represents an archosauromorph with no apparent squamate affinities; the original describers maintained their original conclusion in 2024 that this taxon represents a squamate, while Caldwell and colleagues contested their results in 2025. The oldest unambiguous fossils of Squamata date to the Bathonian age of the Middle Jurassic of the Northern Hemisphere, with the first appearance of many modern groups, including snakes, during this period.

Scientists believe crown group squamates probably originated in the Early Jurassic based on the fossil record, with the oldest unambiguous fossils of squamates dating to the Middle Jurassic. Squamate morphological and ecological diversity substantially increased over the course of the Cretaceous, including the appeance of groups like iguanians and varanoids, and true snakes. Polyglyphanodontia, an extinct clade of lizards, and mosasaurs, a group of predatory marine lizards that grew to enormous sizes, also appeared in the Cretaceous. Squamates suffered a mass extinction at the Cretaceous–Paleogene (K–Pg) boundary, which wiped out polyglyphanodontians, mosasaurs, and many other distinct lineages.

The relationships of squamates are debatable. Although many of the groups originally recognized on the basis of morphology are still accepted, understanding of their relationships to each other has changed radically as a result of studying their genomes. Iguanians were long thought to be the earliest crown group squamates based on morphological data, but genetic data suggest that geckos are the earliest crown group squamates. Iguanians are now united with snakes and anguimorphs in a clade called Toxicofera. Genetic data also suggest that the various limbless groups – snakes, amphisbaenians, and dibamids – are unrelated, and instead arose independently from lizards.

== Reproduction ==
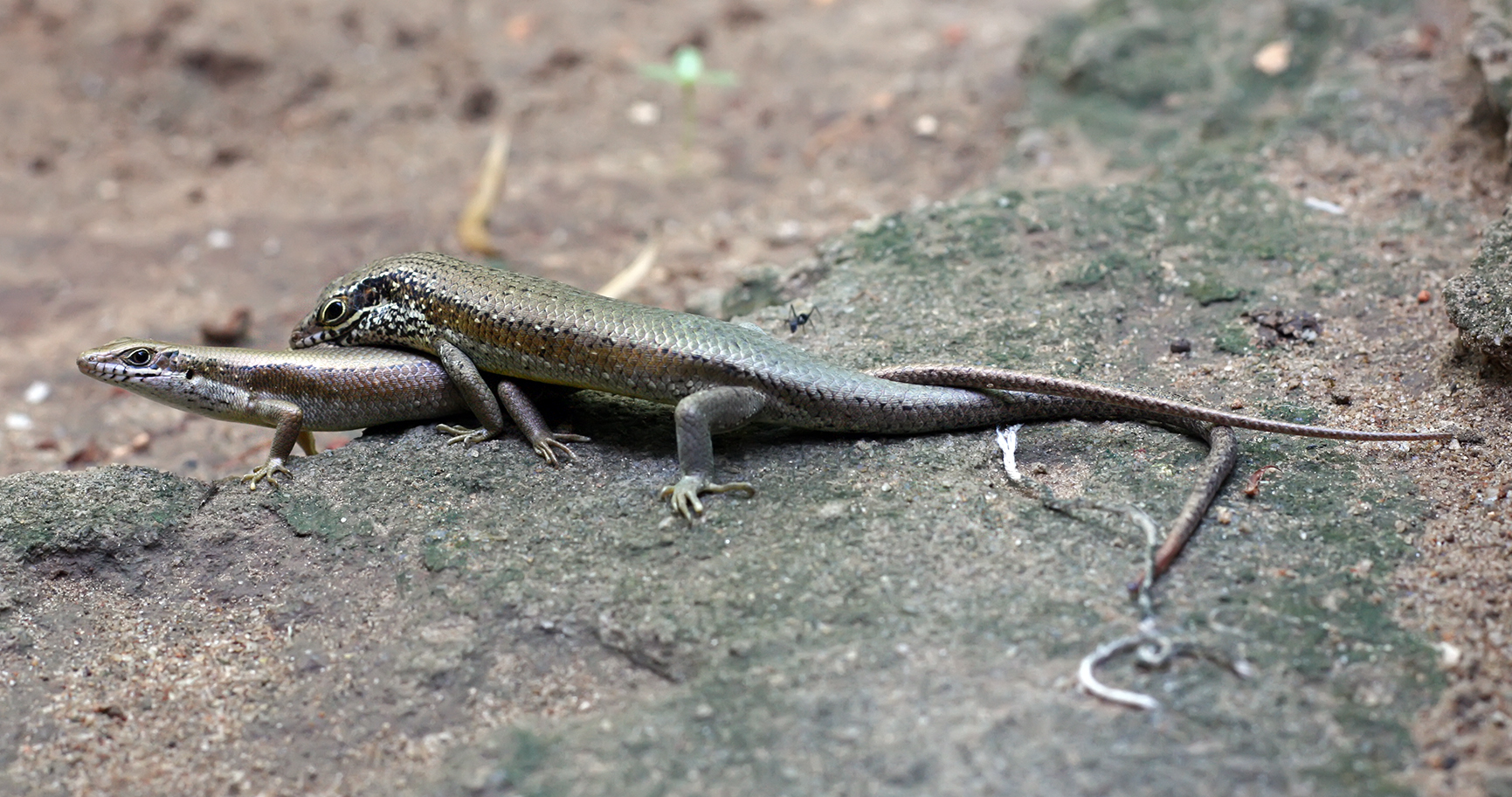
Trachylepis maculilabris skinks mating

The male members of the group Squamata have hemipenes, which are usually held inverted within their bodies, and are everted for reproduction via erectile tissue like that in the mammalian penis. Only one is used at a time, and some evidence indicates that males alternate use between copulations. The hemipenis has a variety of shapes, depending on the species. Often it bears spines or hooks, to anchor the male within the female. Some species even have forked hemipenes (each hemipenis has two tips). Due to being everted and inverted, hemipenes do not have a completely enclosed channel for the conduction of sperm, but rather a seminal groove that seals as the erectile tissue expands. This is also the only reptile group in which both viviparous and ovoviviparous species are found, as well as the usual oviparous reptiles. The eggs in oviparous species have a parchment-like shell. The only exception is found in blind lizards and three families of geckos (Gekkonidae, Phyllodactylidae and Sphaerodactylidae), where many lay rigid and calcified eggs. Some species, such as the Komodo dragon, can reproduce asexually through parthenogenesis.

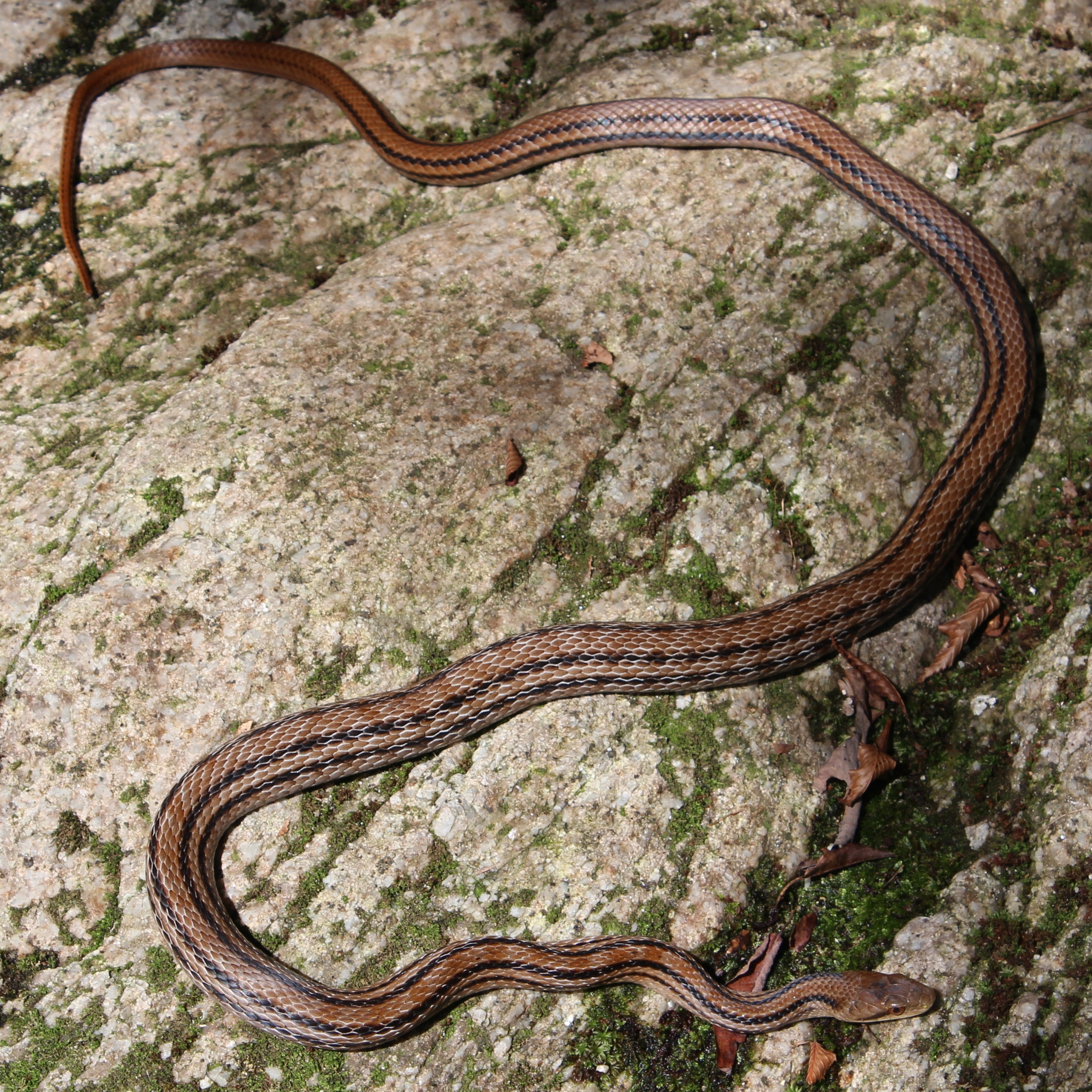
The Japanese striped snake has been studied in sexual selection.

Studies have been conducted on how sexual selection manifests itself in snakes and lizards. Snakes use a variety of tactics in acquiring mates. Ritual combat between males for the females with which they want to mate includes topping, a behavior exhibited by most viperids, in which one male twists around the vertically elevated fore body of his opponent and forcing it downward. Neck biting commonly occurs while the snakes are entwined.

=== Facultative parthenogenesis ===
The effects of central fusion and terminal fusion on heterozygosity

Parthenogenesis is a natural form of reproduction in which the growth and development of embryos occur without fertilization. Agkistrodon contortrix (copperhead snake) and Agkistrodon piscivorus (cottonmouth snake) can reproduce by facultative parthenogenesis; they are capable of switching from a sexual mode of reproduction to an asexual mode. The type of parthenogenesis that likely occurs is automixis with terminal fusion (see figure), a process in which two terminal products from the same meiosis fuse to form a diploid zygote. This process leads to genome-wide homozygosity, expression of deleterious recessive alleles, and often to developmental abnormalities. Both captive-born and wild-born A. contortrix and A. piscivorus appear to be capable of this form of parthenogenesis.

Reproduction in squamate reptiles is ordinarily sexual, with males having a ZZ pair of sex-determining chromosomes, and females a ZW pair. However, the Colombian rainbow boa, Epicrates maurus, can also reproduce by facultative parthenogenesis, resulting in production of WW female progeny. The WW females are likely produced by terminal automixis.

=== Inbreeding avoidance ===
When female sand lizards mate with two or more males, sperm competition within the female's reproductive tract may occur. Active selection of sperm by females appears to occur in a manner that enhances female fitness. On the basis of this selective process, the sperm of males that are more distantly related to the female are preferentially used for fertilization, rather than the sperm of close relatives. This preference may enhance the fitness of progeny by reducing inbreeding depression.

== Evolution of venom ==
Recent research suggests that the evolutionary origin of venom may exist deep in the squamate phylogeny, with 60% of squamates placed in this hypothetical group called Toxicofera. Venom has been known in the clades Caenophidia, Anguimorpha, and Iguania, and has been shown to have evolved a single time along these lineages before the three groups diverged, because all lineages share nine common toxins. The fossil record shows the divergence between anguimorphs, iguanians, and advanced snakes dates back roughly 200 million years ago (Mya) to the Late Triassic/Early Jurassic, but the only good fossil evidence is from the Middle Jurassic.

Snake venom has been shown to have evolved via a process by which a gene encoding for a normal body protein, typically one involved in key regulatory processes or bioactivity, is duplicated, and the copy is selectively expressed in the venom gland. Previous literature hypothesized that venoms were modifications of salivary or pancreatic proteins, but different toxins have been found to have been recruited from numerous different protein bodies and are as diverse as their functions.

Natural selection has driven the origination and diversification of the toxins to counter the defenses of their prey. Once toxins have been recruited into the venom proteome, they form large, multigene families and evolve via the birth-and-death model of protein evolution, which leads to a diversification of toxins that allows the ambush predators the ability to attack a wide range of prey. The rapid evolution and diversification is thought to be the result of a predator–prey evolutionary arms race, where both are adapting to counter the other.

== Humans and squamates ==
=== Bites and fatalities ===
Map showing the global distribution of venomous snakebites

An estimated 125,000 people a year die from venomous snake bites. In the US alone, more than 8,000 venomous snake bites are reported each year, but only one in 50 million people (five or six fatalities per year in the USA) will die from venomous snake bites.

Lizard bites, unlike venomous snake bites, are usually not fatal. The Komodo dragon has been known to kill people due to its size, and recent studies show it may have a passive envenomation system. Recent studies also show that the close relatives of the Komodo, the monitor lizards, all have a similar envenomation system, but the toxicity of the bites is relatively low to humans. The Gila monster and beaded lizards of North and Central America are venomous, but not deadly to humans.

=== Conservation ===
Though they survived the Cretaceous–Paleogene extinction event, many squamate species are now endangered due to habitat loss, hunting and poaching, illegal wildlife trading, alien species being introduced to their habitats (which puts native creatures at risk through competition, disease, and predation), and other anthropogenic causes. Because of this, some squamate species have recently become extinct, with Africa having the most extinct species. Breeding programs and wildlife parks, though, are trying to save many endangered reptiles from extinction. Zoos, private hobbyists, and breeders help educate people about the importance of snakes and lizards.

== Classification and phylogeny ==
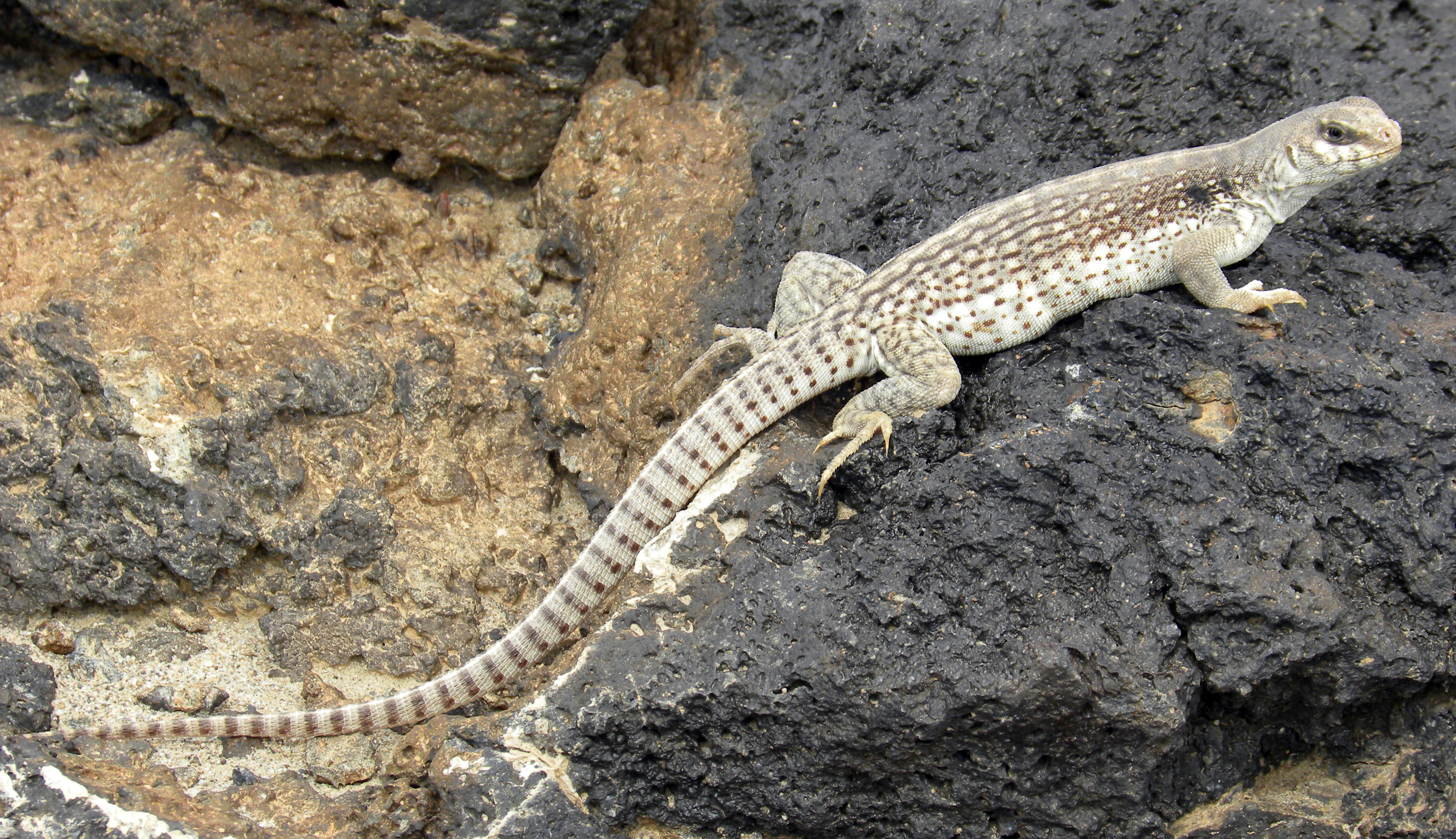
Desert iguana from Amboy Crater, Mojave Desert, California

Historically, the order Squamata has been divided into three suborders:

- Lacertilia, the lizards, including skinks, iguanas and anguimorphs
- Serpentes, the snakes (see also Ophidia)
- Amphisbaenia, the worm lizards

Of these, the lizards form a paraphyletic group, since the "lizards" are found in several distinct lineages, with snakes and amphisbaenians recovered as monophyletic groups nested within. Although studies of squamate relationships using molecular biology have found different relationships between some squamata lineages, all recent molecular studies suggest that the venomous groups are united in a venom clade. Named Toxicofera, it encompasses a majority (nearly 60%) of squamate species and includes Serpentes (snakes), Iguania (agamids, chameleons, iguanids, etc.), and Anguimorpha (monitor lizards, Gila monster, glass lizards, etc.).

One example of a modern classification of the squamates is shown below.

- Squamata
  - Dibamia
    Dibamidae
  - Bifurcata
    - Gekkota
      - Pygopodomorpha
        - Diplodactylidae Underwood 1954
        - - Pygopodidae Boulenger 1884
          - Carphodactylidae
      - Gekkomorpha
        - Eublepharidae
        - Gekkonoidea
          - Sphaerodactylidae Underwood 1954
          - - Phyllodactylidae
            - Gekkonidae
    - Unidentata
      - Scinciformata
        - Scincomorpha
          Scincidae
        - Cordylomorpha
          - Xantusiidae
          - - Gerrhosauridae
            - Cordylidae
      - Episquamata
        - Laterata
          - Teiformata
            - Gymnophthalmidae Merrem 1820
            - Teiidae Gray 1827
          - Lacertibaenia
            - Lacertiformata
              Lacertidae
            - Amphisbaenia
              - Rhineuridae Vanzolini 1951
              - - Bipedidae Taylor 1951
                - - - Blanidae Kearney & Stuart 2004
                    - Cadeidae Vidal & Hedges 2008
                  - - Trogonophidae Gray 1865
                    - Amphisbaenidae Gray 1865
        - Toxicofera
          - - Anguimorpha
              - Paleoanguimorpha
                - Shinisauria
                  Shinisauridae Ahl 1930 sensu Conrad 2006
                - Varanoidea
                  - Lanthanotidae
                  - Varanidae
              - Neoanguimorpha
                - Helodermatoidea
                  Helodermatidae Gray 1837
                - - Xenosauroidea
                    Xenosauridae
                  - Anguioidea
                    - Diploglossidae
                    - - Anniellidae
                      - Anguidae Gray 1825
            - Iguania
              - Acrodonta
                - Chamaeleonidae
                - Agamidae Gray 1827
              - Pleurodonta
                - Leiocephalidae
                - - Iguanidae
                  - - - Hoplocercidae Frost & Etheridge 1989
                      - - Crotaphytidae
                        - Corytophanidae
                    - - Tropiduridae
                      - - - Phrynosomatidae
                          - - Dactyloidae
                            - Polychrotidae
                        - - Liolaemidae
                          - - Leiosauridae
                            - Opluridae
          - Serpentes
            - Scolecophidia
              - Leptotyphlopidae Stejneger 1892
              - - Gerrhopilidae Vidal et al. 2010
                - - Xenotyphlopidae Vidal et al. 2010
                  - Typhlopidae Merrem 1820
            - - Anomalepididae
              - Alethinophidia
                - Amerophidia
                  - Aniliidae
                  - Tropidophiidae Brongersma 1951
                - Afrophidia
                  - Booidea
                    - - Uropeltidae
                      - - Anomochilidae
                        - Cylindrophiidae
                    - - - Xenopeltidae Bonaparte 1845
                        - - Loxocemidae
                          - Pythonidae Fitzinger 1826
                      - - Boidae
                        - - Xenophidiidae
                          - Bolyeriidae Hoffstetter 1946
                  - Caenophidia
                    - Acrochordidae Bonaparte 1831
                    - Colubroides
                      - Xenodermidae
                      - - Pareidae
                        - - Viperidae
                          - Proteroglypha
                            - Homalopsidae
                            - - Colubridae
                              - - Lamprophiidae
                                - Elapidae

== List of extant families ==
The over 10,900 extant squamates are divided into 68 families.

Amphisbaenia
Family	Common names	Example species	Example photo
Amphisbaenidae; Gray, 1865	Tropical worm lizards	Darwin's worm lizard (Amphisbaena darwinii)	
Bipedidae; Taylor, 1951	Bipes worm lizards	Mexican mole lizard (Bipes biporus)	
Blanidae; Kearney, 2003	Mediterranean worm lizards	Mediterranean worm lizard (Blanus cinereus)	
Cadeidae; Vidal & Hedges, 2007	Cuban worm lizards	Cadea blanoides	
Rhineuridae; Vanzolini, 1951	North American worm lizards	North American worm lizard (Rhineura floridana)	
Trogonophidae; Gray, 1865	Palearctic worm lizards	Checkerboard worm lizard (Trogonophis wiegmanni)	
Gekkota (geckos, incl. Dibamia)
Family	Common names	Example species	Example photo
Carphodactylidae; Kluge, 1967	Southern padless geckos	Thick-tailed gecko (Underwoodisaurus milii)	
Dibamidae; Boulenger, 1884	Blind lizards	Dibamus nicobaricum	
Diplodactylidae; Underwood, 1954	Australasian geckos	Golden-tailed gecko (Strophurus taenicauda)	
Eublepharidae; Boulenger, 1883	Eyelid geckos	Common leopard gecko (Eublepharis macularius)	
Gekkonidae; Gray, 1825	Geckos	Madagascar giant day gecko (Phelsuma grandis)	
Phyllodactylidae; Gamble et al., 2008	Leaf finger geckos	Moorish gecko (Tarentola mauritanica)	
Pygopodidae; Boulenger, 1884	Flap-footed lizards	Burton's snake lizard (Lialis burtonis)	
Sphaerodactylidae; Underwood, 1954	Round finger geckos	Fantastic least gecko (Sphaerodactylus fantasticus)	
Iguania
Family	Common names	Example species	Example photo
Agamidae; Gray, 1827	Agamas	Eastern bearded dragon (Pogona barbata)	
Chamaeleonidae; Rafinesque, 1815	Chameleons	Veiled chameleon (Chamaeleo calyptratus)	
Corytophanidae; Fitzinger, 1843	Casquehead lizards	Plumed basilisk (Basiliscus plumifrons)	
Crotaphytidae; H.M. Smith & Brodie, 1982	Collared and leopard lizards	Common collared lizard (Crotaphytus collaris)	
Dactyloidae; Fitzinger, 1843	Anoles	Carolina anole (Anolis carolinensis)	
Hoplocercidae; Frost & Etheridge, 1989	Wood lizards or clubtails	Enyalioides binzayedi	
Iguanidae; Oppel, 1811	Iguanas	Marine iguana (Amblyrhynchus cristatus)	
Leiocephalidae; Frost & Etheridge, 1989	Curly-tailed lizards	Hispaniolan masked curly-tailed lizard (Leiocephalus personatus)	
Leiosauridae; Frost et al., 2001	Leiosaurid lizards	Enyalius bilineatus	
Liolaemidae; Frost & Etheridge, 1989	Tree iguanas, snow swifts	Shining tree iguana (Liolaemus nitidus)	
Opluridae; Titus & Frost, 1996	Malagasy iguanas	Chalarodon madagascariensis	
Phrynosomatidae; Fitzinger, 1843	Earless, spiny, tree, side-blotched and horned lizards	Greater earless lizard (Cophosaurus texanus)	
Polychrotidae; Frost & Etheridge, 1989	Bush anoles	Brazilian bush anole (Polychrus acutirostris)	
Tropiduridae; Bell, 1843	Neotropical ground lizards	Microlophus peruvianus	
Lacertoidea (excl. Amphisbaenia)
Family	Common names	Example Species	Example Photo
Alopoglossidae; Goicoechea, Frost, De la Riva, Pellegrino, Sites Jr., Rodrigues, & Padial, 2016	Alopoglossid lizards	Alopoglossus vallensis	
Gymnophthalmidae; Fitzinger, 1826	Spectacled lizards	Bachia bicolor	
Lacertidae; Oppel, 1811	Wall lizards	Ocellated lizard (Lacerta lepida)	
Teiidae; Gray, 1827	Tegus and whiptails	Gold tegu (Tupinambis teguixin)	
Anguimorpha
Family	Common names	Example species	Example photo
Anguidae; Gray, 1825	Glass lizards, alligator lizards and slowworms	Slowworm (Anguis fragilis)	
Anniellidae; Boulenger, 1885	American legless lizards	California legless lizard (Anniella pulchra)	
Diploglossidae; Bocourt, 1873	galliwasps, legless lizards	Jamaican giant galliwasp (Celestus occiduus)	-
Helodermatidae; Gray, 1837	Beaded lizards	Gila monster (Heloderma suspectum)	-
Lanthanotidae; Steindachner, 1877	Earless monitor	Earless monitor (Lanthanotus borneensis)	
Shinisauridae; Ahl, 1930	Chinese crocodile lizard	Chinese crocodile lizard (Shinisaurus crocodilurus)	
Varanidae; Merrem, 1820	Monitor lizards	Perentie (Varanus giganteus)	
Xenosauridae; Cope, 1866	Knob-scaled lizards	Mexican knob-scaled lizard (Xenosaurus grandis)	
Scincoidea
Family	Common names	Example Species	Example Photo
Cordylidae; Fitzinger, 1826	Girdled lizards	Girdle-tailed lizard (Cordylus warreni)	
Gerrhosauridae; Fitzinger, 1843	Plated lizards	Sudan plated lizard (Gerrhosaurus major)	
Scincidae; Oppel, 1811	Skinks	Western blue-tongued skink (Tiliqua occipitalis)	
Xantusiidae; Baird, 1858	Night lizards	Granite night lizard (Xantusia henshawi)	
Alethinophidia
Family	Common names	Example species	Example photo
Acrochordidae; Bonaparte, 1831	File snakes	Marine file snake (Acrochordus granulatus)	
Aniliidae; Stejneger, 1907	Coral pipe snakes	Burrowing false coral (Anilius scytale)	
Anomochilidae; Cundall, Wallach and Rossman, 1993.	Dwarf pipe snakes	Leonard's pipe snake, (Anomochilus leonardi)	
Atractaspididae; Günther, 1858	Mole vipers, Stiletto snakes, or Burrowing asps	Bibron's stiletto snake (Atractaspis bibronii)	Atractaspis_bibronii_full_body
Boidae; Gray, 1825 (incl. Calabariidae)	Boas	Amazon tree boa (Corallus hortulanus)	
Colubridae; Oppel, 1811 sensu lato (incl. Dipsadidae, Natricidae, Pseudoxenodontidae)	Colubrids	Grass snake (Natrix natrix)	
Cylindrophiidae; Fitzinger, 1843	Asian pipe snakes	Red-tailed pipe snake (Cylindrophis ruffus)	
Elapidae; Boie, 1827	Cobras, coral snakes, mambas, kraits, sea snakes, sea kraits, Australian elapids	King cobra (Ophiophagus hannah)	
Homalopsidae; Bonaparte, 1845	Indo-Australian water snakes, mudsnakes, bockadams	New Guinea bockadam (Cerberus rynchops)	
Lamprophiidae; Fitzinger, 1843	Lamprophiid snakes	Aurora House snake (Lamprophis aurora)	Lamprophis_aurora_165110793
Loxocemidae; Cope, 1861	Mexican burrowing snakes	Mexican burrowing snake (Loxocemus bicolor)	
Micrelapidae; Das et al., 2023	Two-headed snakes	Somali Two-headed snake (Micrelaps vaillanti)	Micrelaps_vaillanti_459696
Pareidae; Romer, 1956	Pareid snakes	Perrotet's mountain snake (Xylophis perroteti)	
Pythonidae; Fitzinger, 1826	Pythons	Ball python (Python regius)	
Tropidophiidae; Brongersma, 1951	Dwarf boas	Northern eyelash boa (Trachyboa boulengeri)	
Uropeltidae; Müller, 1832	Shield-tailed snakes, short-tailed snakes	Cuvier's shieldtail (Uropeltis ceylanica)	
Viperidae; Oppel, 1811	Vipers, pitvipers, rattlesnakes	European asp (Vipera aspis)	
Xenodermidae; Fitzinger, 1826	Odd-scaled snakes and relatives	Khase earth snake (Stoliczkia khasiensis)	
Xenopeltidae; Gray, 1849	Sunbeam snakes	Sunbeam snake (Xenopeltis unicolor)	
Scolecophidia (incl. Anomalepidae)
Family	Common names	Example species	Example photo
Anomalepidae; Taylor, 1939	Dawn blind snakes	Dawn blind snake (Liotyphlops beui)	
Gerrhopilidae; Vidal et al., 2010	Indo-Malayan blindsnakes	Andaman worm snake (Gerrhopilus andamanensis)	–
Leptotyphlopidae; Stejneger, 1892	Slender blind snakes	Texas blind snake (Leptotyphlops dulcis)	
Typhlopidae; Merrem, 1820	Blind snakes	European blind snake (Typhlops vermicularis)	
Xenotyphlopidae; Vidal et al., 2010	Malagasy blind snakes	Xenotyphlops grandidieri	–
