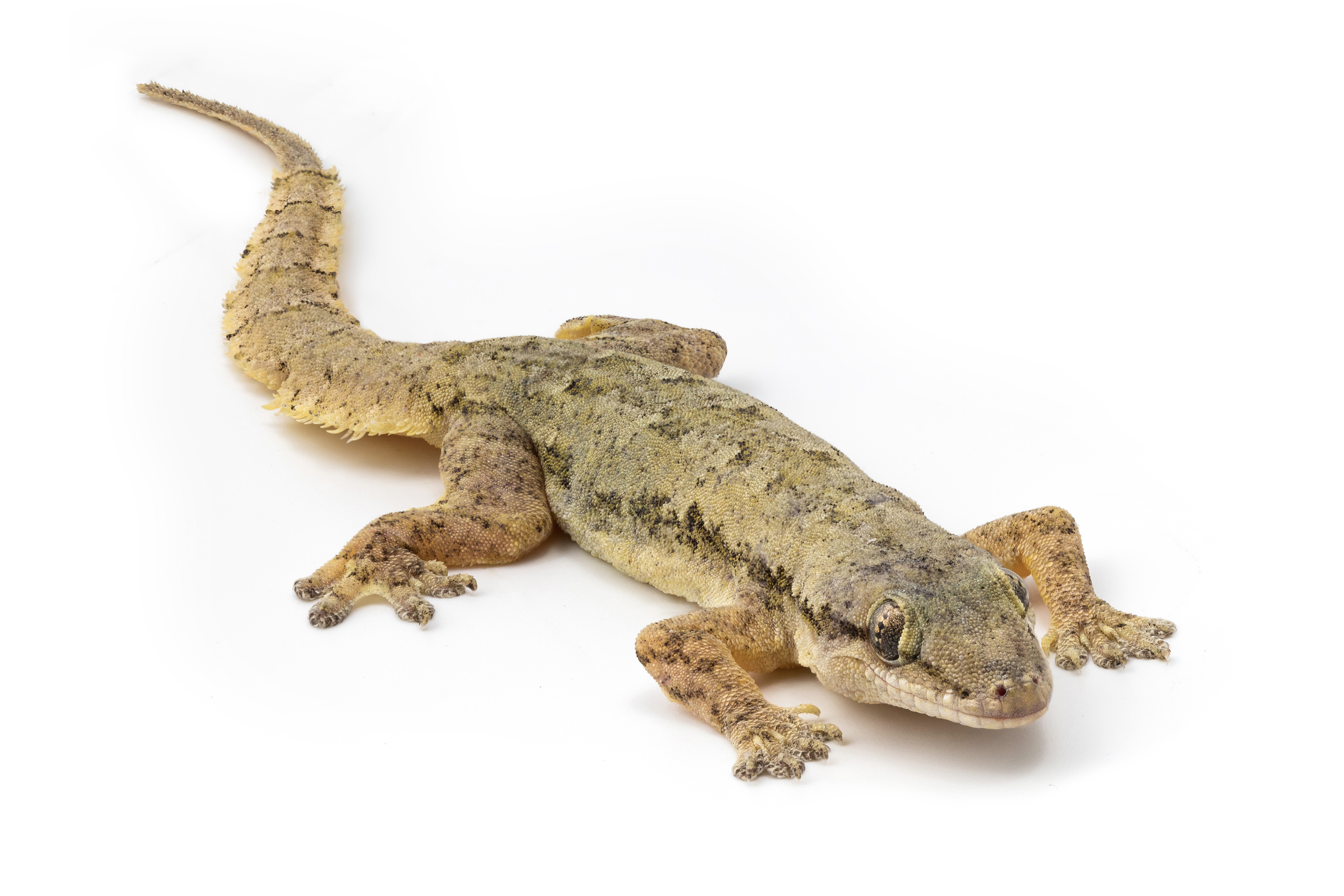
- Flat-tailed House Gecko (Hemidactylus platyurus)

Scientific classification
- Kingdom: Animalia
- Phylum: Chordata
- Class: Reptilia
- Order: Squamata
- Suborder: Lacertilia

Groups included
- Anguimorpha; Dibamidae; Gekkota; Iguania; Lacertoidea; Scincomorpha; †Mosasauroidea
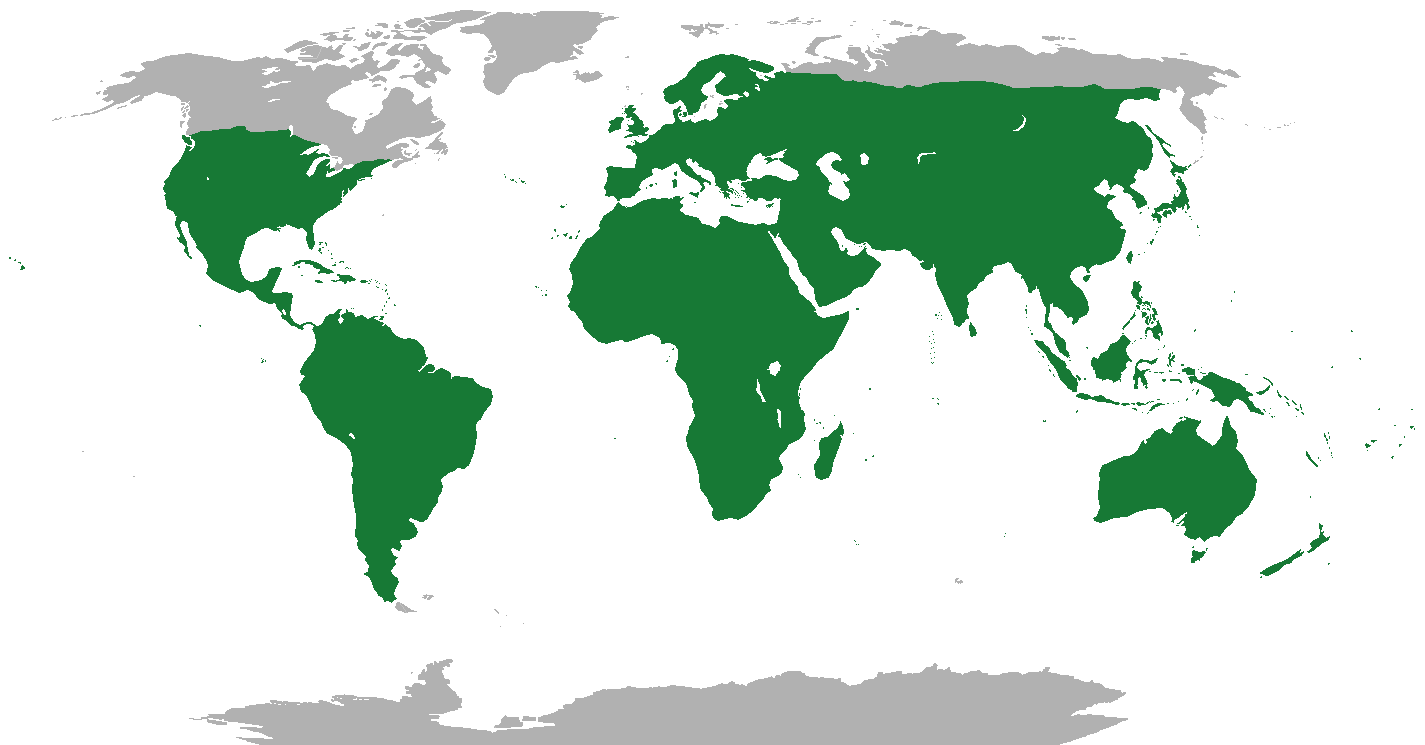
- Range of the lizards, all species.

Cladistically included but traditionally excluded taxa
- Serpentes; Amphisbaenia (sometimes)

= Lizard =

Lizards Temporal range: Middle Jurassic – Holocene, 168–0 Ma

Informal group of reptiles

Lizard is the common name used for all squamate reptiles that are not snakes (and to a lesser extent amphisbaenians or "worm lizards"), encompassing over 7,000 species. They have a cosmopolitan distribution, ranging across all continents except Antarctica, as well as most oceanic island chains. Extant lizard species vary in size from the 13.5 mm (0.53 in) nano-chameleon and the 14–18 mm (0.55–0.71 in) Jaragua dwarf gecko to the 3-meter-long Komodo dragon.

Most lizards are quadrupedal with a side-to-side swaying gait, although some lizards are capable of running on hindlimbs. Some lineages (known as "legless lizards") have secondarily lost their limbs and developed a snake-like elongated body due to convergent evolution. Some lizards, such as the arboreal Draco, are capable of gliding flight using fanned-out gular membranes and costal patagia as wings. They are often territorial, the males fighting off other males and signalling, often with bright colours, to attract mates and to intimidate rivals. Lizards are mainly carnivorous, often being ambush predators; smaller lizard species eat insects and other invertebrates, while the larger monitor lizards can prey upon tetrapods as big as water buffalo.

Lizards are able to thrive in a wide range of habitats, from wetlands to deserts, from alpine meadows to coastal caves, from arctic tundra to tropical islands like the Galápagos. Some small lizards like the common house gecko and pale-flecked garden sunskink are able to adapt to niches within human settlements and become a part of the urban wildlife. As most lizards are relatively small, they are preyed upon by larger animals such as mammals, birds, other reptiles, and even fish and large frogs, as well as predatory invertebrates such as spiders, praying mantises and giant centipedes, and thus have a variety of antipredator adaptations including venom, camouflage, reflex bleeding and the ability to self-amputate their tail as a decoy that distracts the predator.

Snakes are descended from lizards, so cladistic classification systems often regard "lizard" as a paraphyletic group, and some lizards are more closely related to snakes than they are to other lizards. To regard lizards as a monophyletic group, one would have to classify snakes as a clade/subgroup of specialized lizards, and this would also make "lizards" and "squamates" synonyms.

== Anatomy ==
=== Largest and smallest ===
The adult length of species within the suborder ranges from a few centimeters for chameleons such as Brookesia micra and geckos such as Sphaerodactylus ariasae to nearly 3 m (10 ft) in the case of the largest living varanid lizard, the Komodo dragon. Most lizards are fairly small animals.

=== Distinguishing features ===
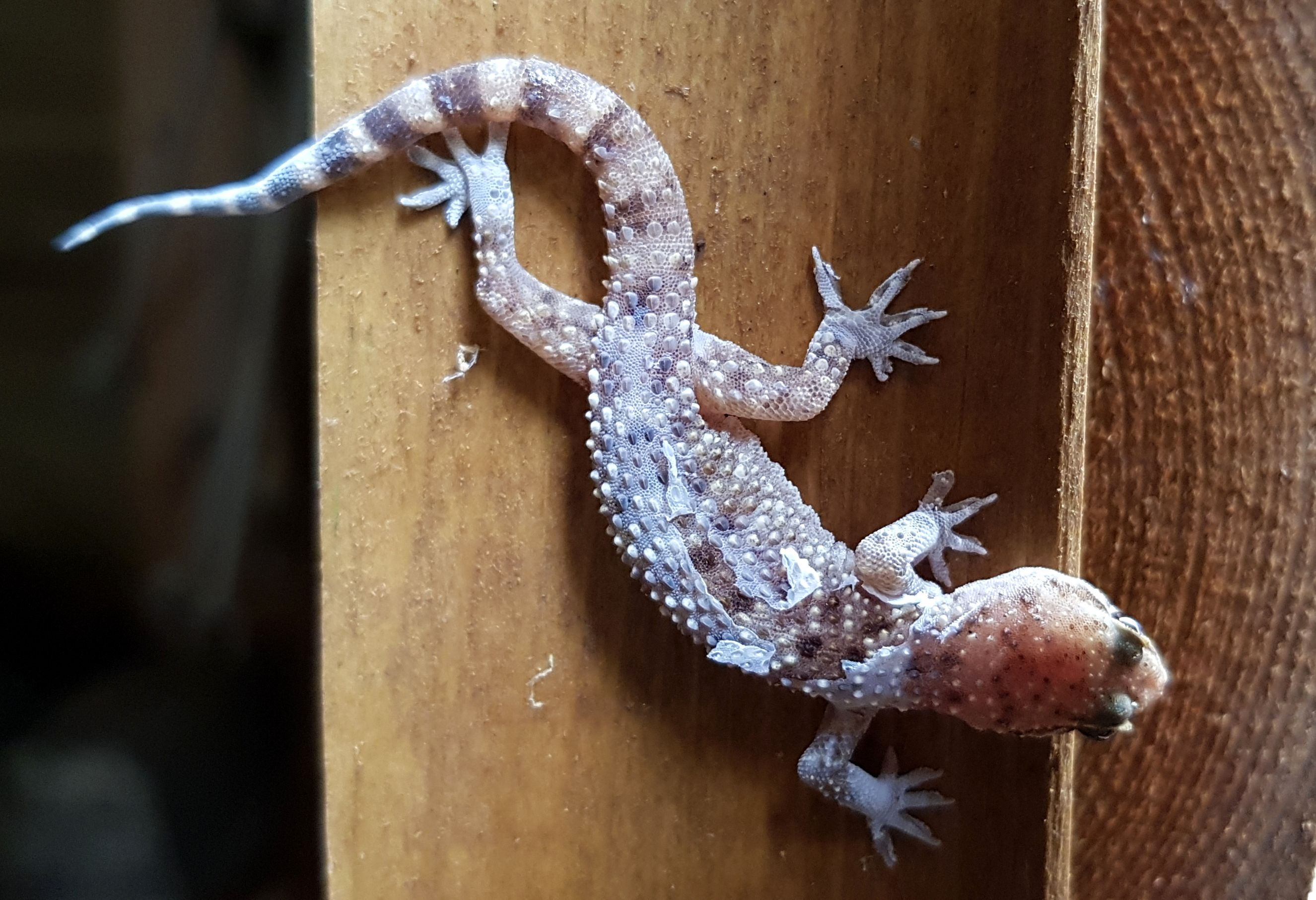
A young Mediterranean house gecko in the process of moulting.

Lizards typically have rounded torsos, elevated heads on short necks, four limbs and long tails, although some are legless. Lizards and snakes share a movable quadrate bone, distinguishing them from the rhynchocephalians, which have more rigid diapsid skulls. Some lizards such as chameleons have prehensile tails, assisting them in climbing among vegetation.

As in other reptiles, the skin of lizards is covered in overlapping scales made of keratin. This provides protection from the environment and reduces water loss through evaporation. This adaptation enables lizards to thrive in some of the driest deserts on earth. The skin is tough and leathery, and is shed (sloughed) as the animal grows. Unlike snakes which shed the skin in a single piece, lizards slough their skin in several pieces. The scales may be modified into spines for display or protection, and some species have bone osteoderms underneath the scales.

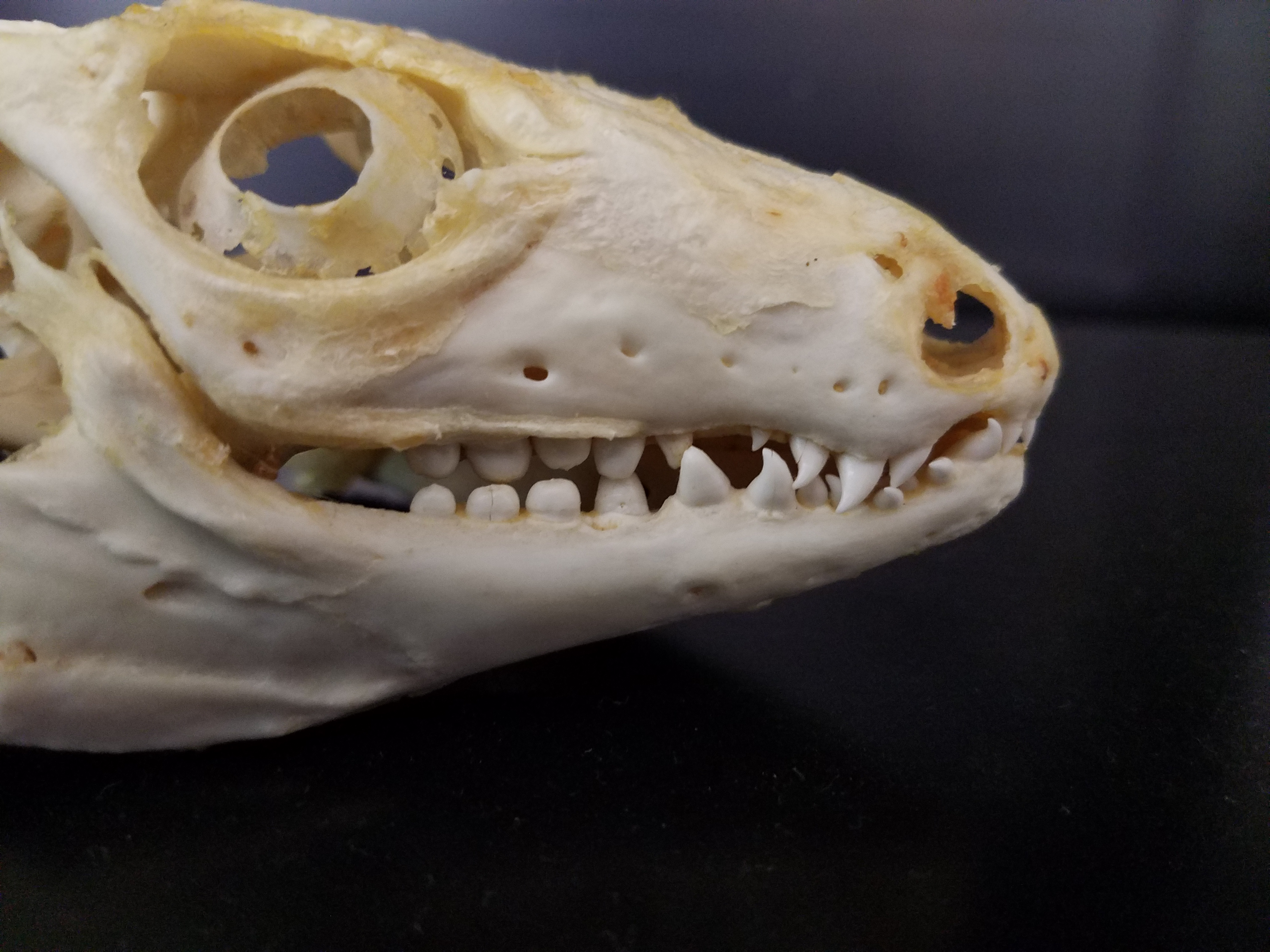
Red tegu (Tupinambis rufescens) skull, showing teeth of differing types

The dentitions of lizards reflect their wide range of diets, including carnivorous, insectivorous, omnivorous, herbivorous, nectivorous, and molluscivorous. Species typically have uniform teeth suited to their diet, but several species have variable teeth, such as cutting teeth in the front of the jaws and crushing teeth in the rear. Most species are pleurodont, though agamids and chameleons are acrodont. Komodo dragons have iron-reinforced teeth, with high concentrations of iron strengthening the tips and serrated edges. This natural, orange-pigmented iron coating acts as a protective, wear-resistant layer that keeps their teeth sharp to tear through.

The tongue can be extended outside the mouth, and is often long. In the beaded lizards, whiptails and monitor lizards, the tongue is forked and used mainly or exclusively to sense the environment, continually flicking out to sample the environment, and back to transfer molecules to the vomeronasal organ responsible for chemosensation, analogous to but different from smell or taste. In geckos, the tongue is used to lick the eyes clean: they have no eyelids. Chameleons have very long sticky tongues which can be extended rapidly to catch their insect prey.

Three lineages, the geckos, anoles, and to a lesser extent chameleons, have modified the scales under their toes to form adhesive pads. The pads are composed of millions of tiny setae (hair-like structures) which fit closely to the substrate to adhere using van der Waals forces; no liquid adhesive is needed. In addition, the toes of chameleons are divided into two opposed groups on each foot (zygodactyly), enabling them to perch on branches as birds do. (Note: Chameleon forefeet have groups composed of 3 inner and 2 outer digits; the hindfeet have groups of 2 inner and 3 outer digits.)

== Physiology ==
=== Locomotion ===
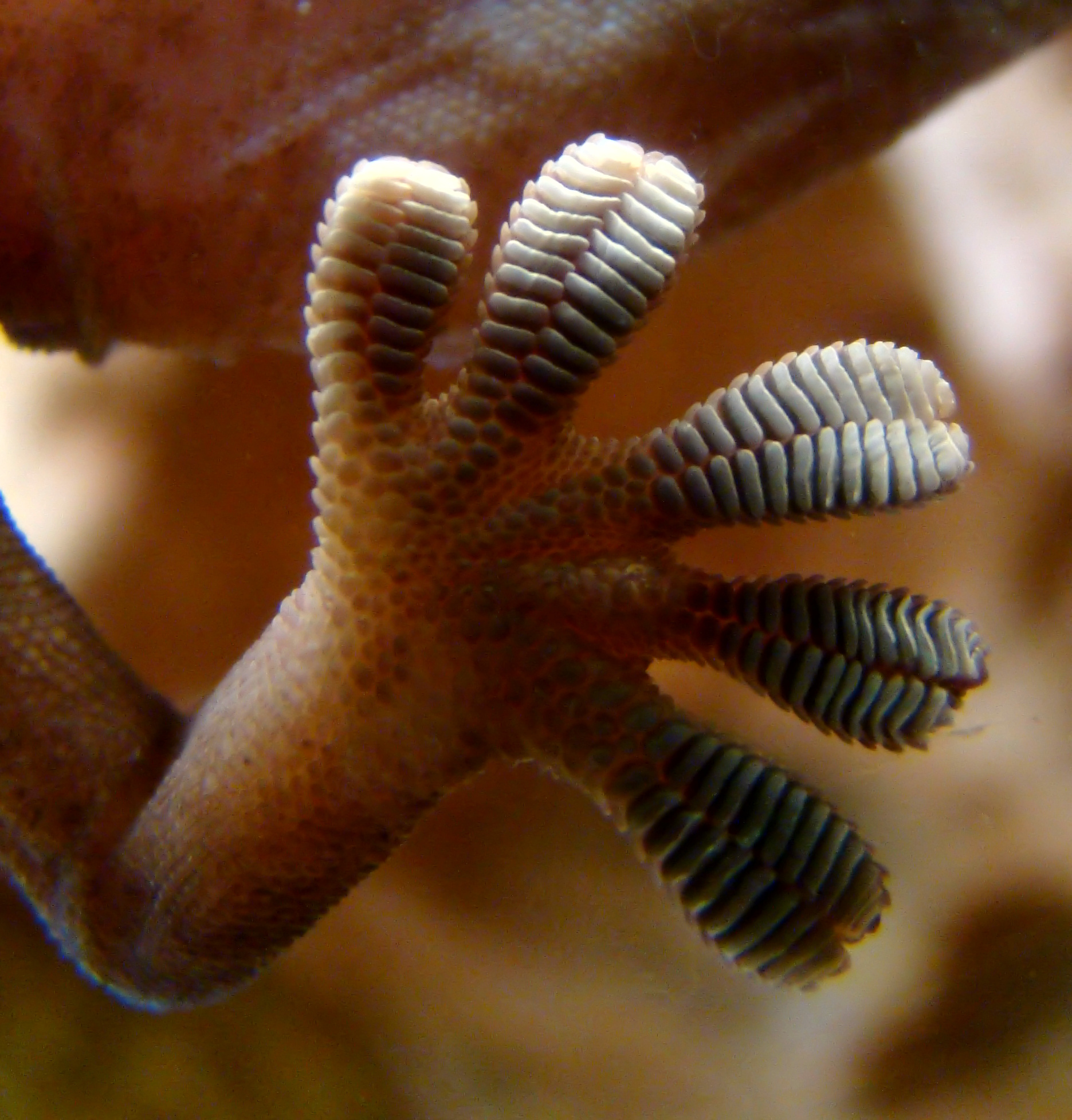
Adhesive pads enable geckos to climb vertically.

Aside from legless lizards, most lizards are quadrupedal and move using gaits with alternating movement of the right and left limbs with substantial body bending. This body bending prevents significant respiration during movement, limiting their endurance, in a mechanism called Carrier's constraint. Several species can run bipedally, and a few can prop themselves up on their hindlimbs and tail while stationary. Several small species such as those in the genus Draco can glide: some can attain a distance of 60 metres (200 feet), losing 10 metres (33 feet) in height. Some species, like geckos and chameleons, adhere to vertical surfaces including glass and ceilings. Some species, like the common basilisk, can run across water.

=== Senses ===
Lizards make use of their senses of sight, touch, olfaction and hearing like other vertebrates. The balance of these varies with the habitat of different species; for instance, skinks that live largely covered by loose soil rely heavily on olfaction and touch, while geckos depend largely on acute vision for their ability to hunt and to evaluate the distance to their prey before striking. Monitor lizards have acute vision, hearing, and olfactory senses. Some lizards make unusual use of their sense organs: chameleons can steer their eyes in different directions, sometimes providing non-overlapping fields of view, such as forwards and backwards at once. Lizards lack external ears, having instead a circular opening in which the tympanic membrane (eardrum) can be seen. Many species rely on hearing for early warning of predators, and flee at the slightest sound.

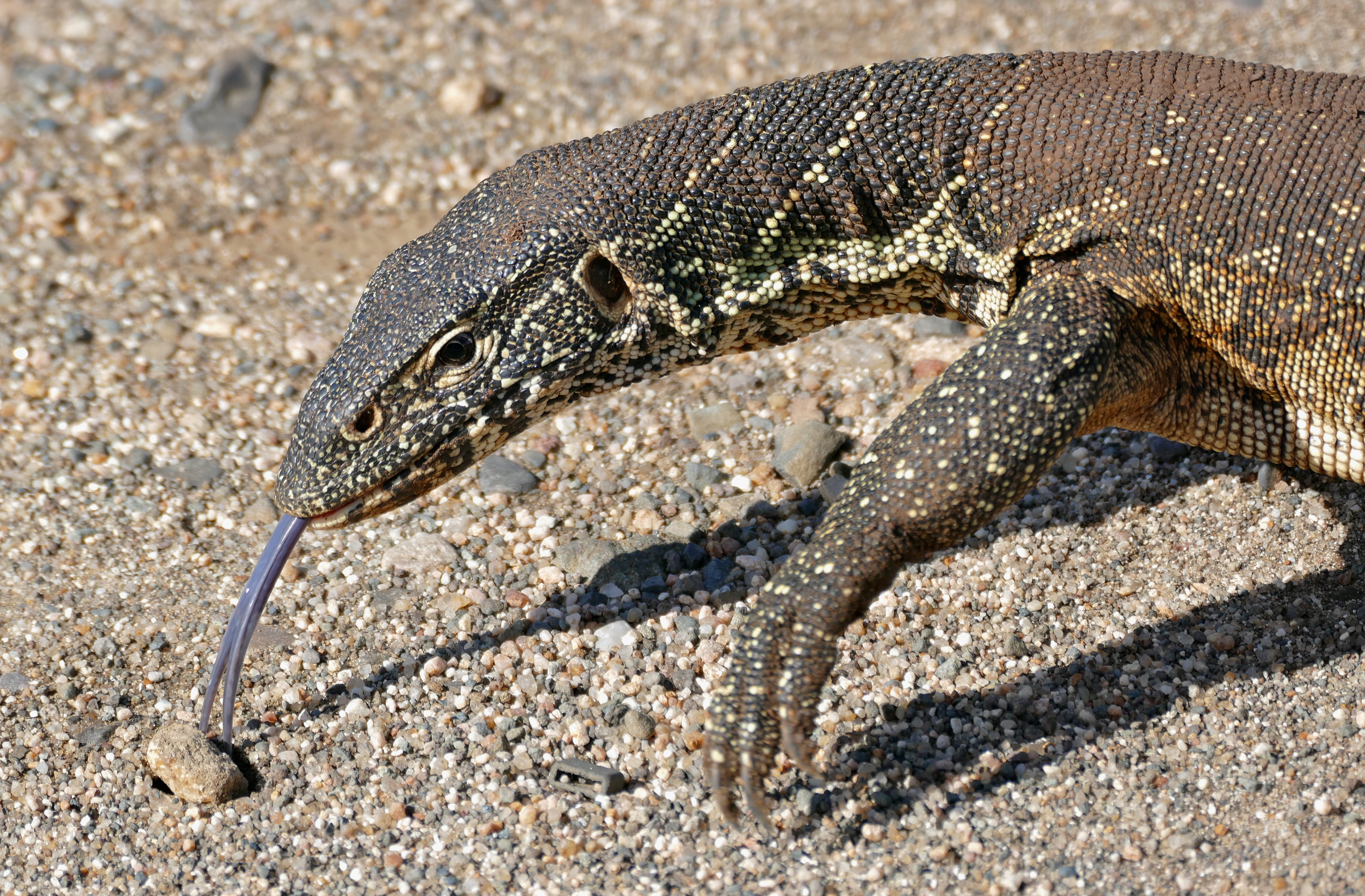
Nile monitor using its tongue for smell

As in snakes and many mammals, all lizards have a specialised olfactory system, the vomeronasal organ, used to detect pheromones. Monitor lizards transfer scent from the tip of their tongue to the organ; the tongue is used only for this information-gathering purpose, and is not involved in manipulating food.

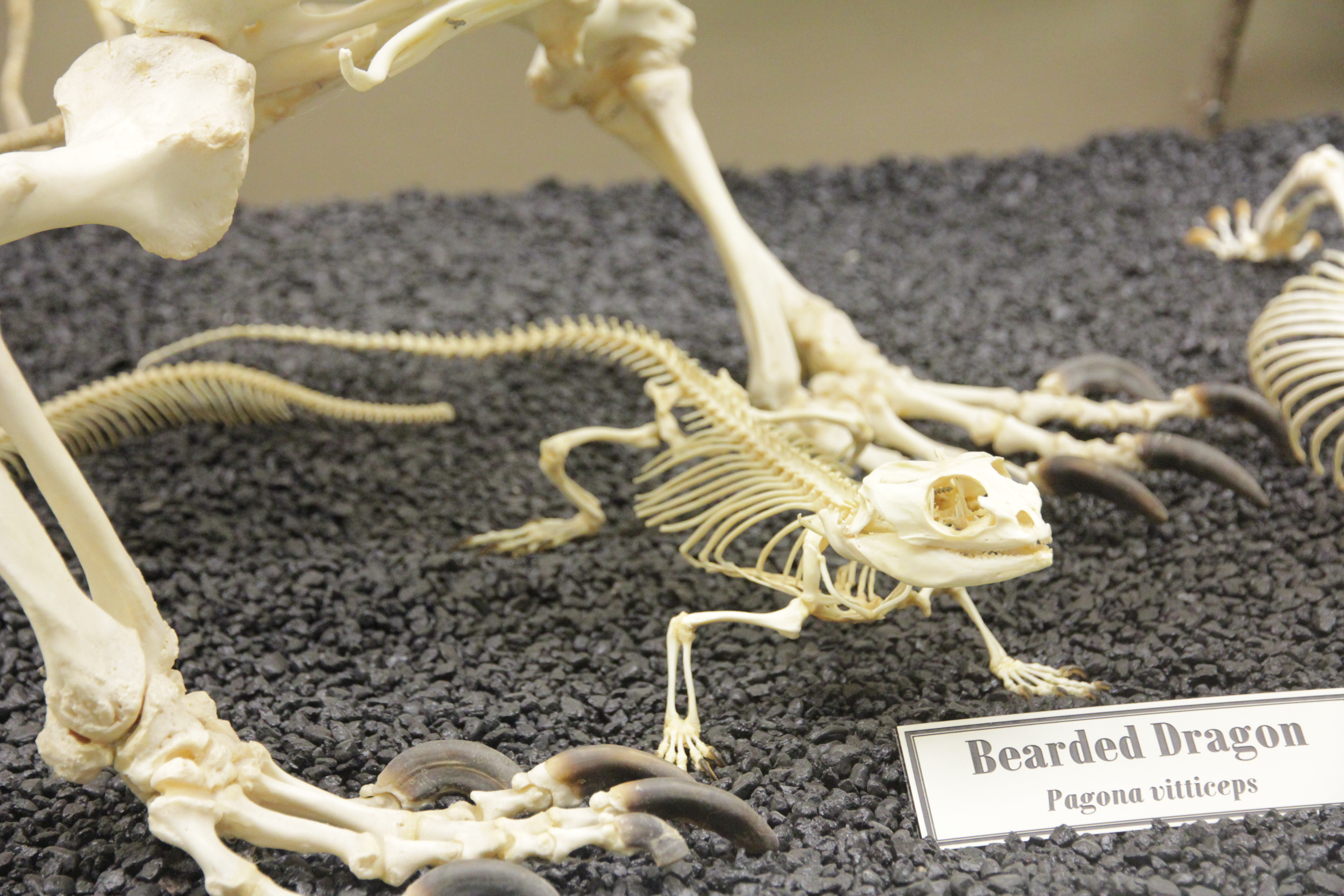
Skeleton of bearded dragon (pogona sp.) on display at the Museum of Osteology.

Some lizards, particularly iguanas, have retained a photosensory organ on the top of their heads called the parietal eye, a basal ("primitive") feature also present in the tuatara. This "eye" has only a rudimentary retina and lens and cannot form images, but is sensitive to changes in light and dark and can detect movement. This helps them detect predators stalking it from above.

=== Venom ===
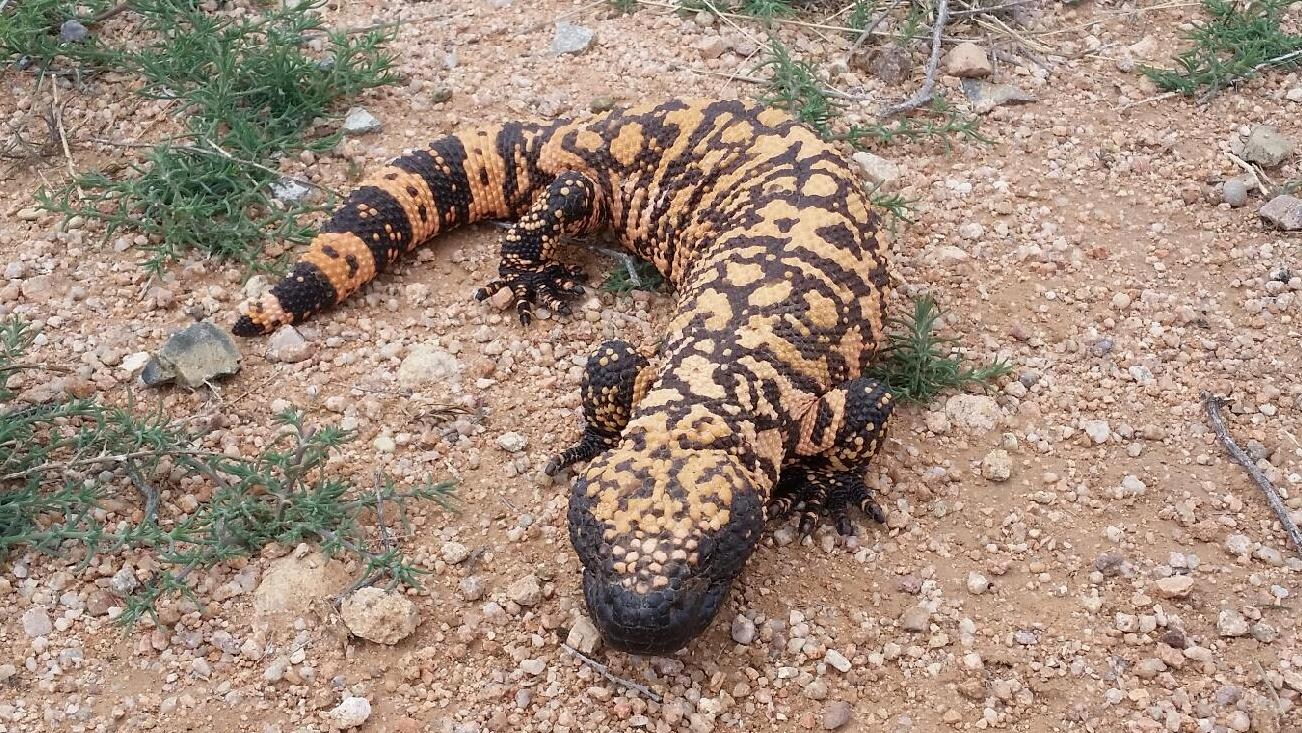
Some lizards including the Gila monster are venomous.

Until 2006 it was thought that the Gila monster and the Mexican beaded lizard were the only venomous lizards. However, several species of monitor lizards, including the Komodo dragon, produce powerful venom in their salivary glands. Lace monitor venom, for instance, causes swift loss of consciousness and extensive bleeding through its pharmacological effects, both lowering blood pressure and preventing blood clotting. Nine classes of toxin known from snakes are produced by lizards. The range of actions provides the potential for new medicinal drugs based on lizard venom proteins.

Genes associated with venom toxins have been found in the salivary glands of a wide range of lizards, including species traditionally thought of as non-venomous, such as iguanas and bearded dragons. This suggests that these genes evolved in the common ancestor of lizards and snakes, some 200 million years ago (forming a single clade, the Toxicofera). However, most of these putative venom genes were "housekeeping genes" found in all cells and tissues, including skin and cloacal scent glands. The genes in question may thus be evolutionary precursors of venom genes.

=== Respiration ===
Recent studies (2013 and 2014) on the lung anatomy of the savannah monitor and green iguana found them to have a unidirectional airflow system, which involves the air moving in a loop through the lungs when breathing. This was previously thought to only exist in the archosaurs (crocodilians and birds). This may be evidence that unidirectional airflow is an ancestral trait in diapsids.

=== Reproduction and life cycle ===
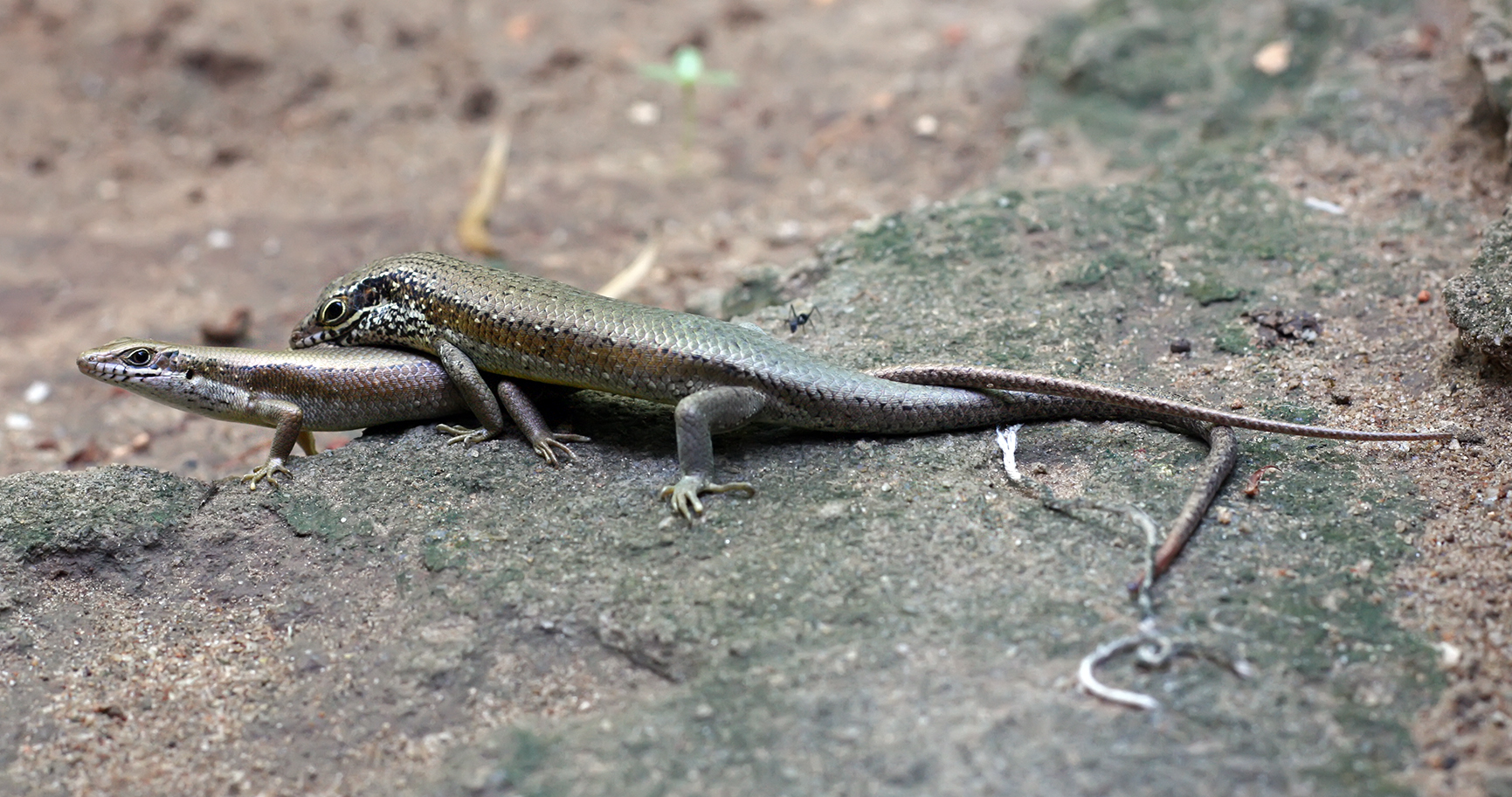
Trachylepis maculilabris skinks mating

As with all amniotes, lizards rely on internal fertilisation and copulation involves the male inserting one of his hemipenes into the female's cloaca. Female lizards also have hemiclitorises, a doubled clitoris. The majority of species are oviparous (egg laying). The female deposits the eggs in a protective structure like a nest or crevice or simply on the ground. Depending on the species, clutch size can vary from 4–5 percent of the females body weight to 40–50 percent and clutches range from one or a few large eggs to dozens of small ones.

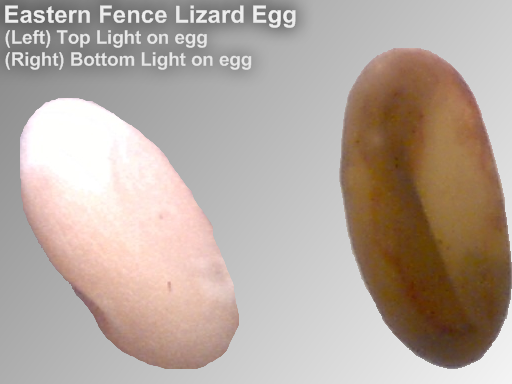
Two pictures of an eastern fence lizard egg layered onto one image.

In most lizards, the eggs have leathery shells to allow for the exchange of water, although more arid-living species have calcified shells to retain water. Inside the eggs, the embryos use nutrients from the yolk. Parental care is uncommon and the female usually abandons the eggs after laying them. Brooding and protection of eggs do occur in some species. The female prairie skink uses respiratory water loss to maintain the humidity of the eggs which facilitates embryonic development. In lace monitors, the young hatch close to 300 days, and the female returns to help them escape the termite mound where the eggs were laid.

Around 20 percent of lizard species reproduce via viviparity (live birth). This is particularly common in Anguimorphs. Viviparous species give birth to relatively developed young which look like miniature adults. Embryos are nourished via a placenta-like structure. A minority of lizards have parthenogenesis (reproduction from unfertilised eggs). These species consist of all females who reproduce asexually with no need for males. This is known to occur in various species of whiptail lizards. Parthenogenesis was also recorded in species that normally reproduce sexually. A captive female Komodo dragon produced a clutch of eggs, despite being separated from males for over two years.

A lizard's sex can be determined by temperature. The temperature of the eggs' micro-environment can determine the sex of the hatched young: low temperature incubation produces more females while higher temperatures produce more males. However, some lizards have sex chromosomes and both male heterogamety (XY and XXY) and female heterogamety (ZW) occur.

=== Aging ===
A significant component of aging in the painted dragon lizard Ctenophorus pictus is fading breeding colors. By manipulating superoxide levels (using a superoxide dismutase mimetic) it was shown that this fading coloration is likely due to gradual loss with lizard age of an innate capacity for antioxidation due to increasing DNA damage.

== Behaviour ==
=== Diurnality and thermoregulation ===
The majority of lizard species are active during the day, though some are active at night, notably geckos. As ectotherms, lizards have a limited ability to regulate their body temperature, and must seek out and bask in sunlight to gain enough heat to become fully active. Thermoregulation behavior can be beneficial in the short term for lizards as it allows the ability to buffer environmental variation and endure climate warming.

In high altitudes, the Podarcis hispanicus responds to higher temperature with a darker dorsal coloration to prevent UV-radiation and background matching. Their thermoregulatory mechanisms also allow the lizard to maintain their ideal body temperature for optimal mobility.

=== Territoriality ===
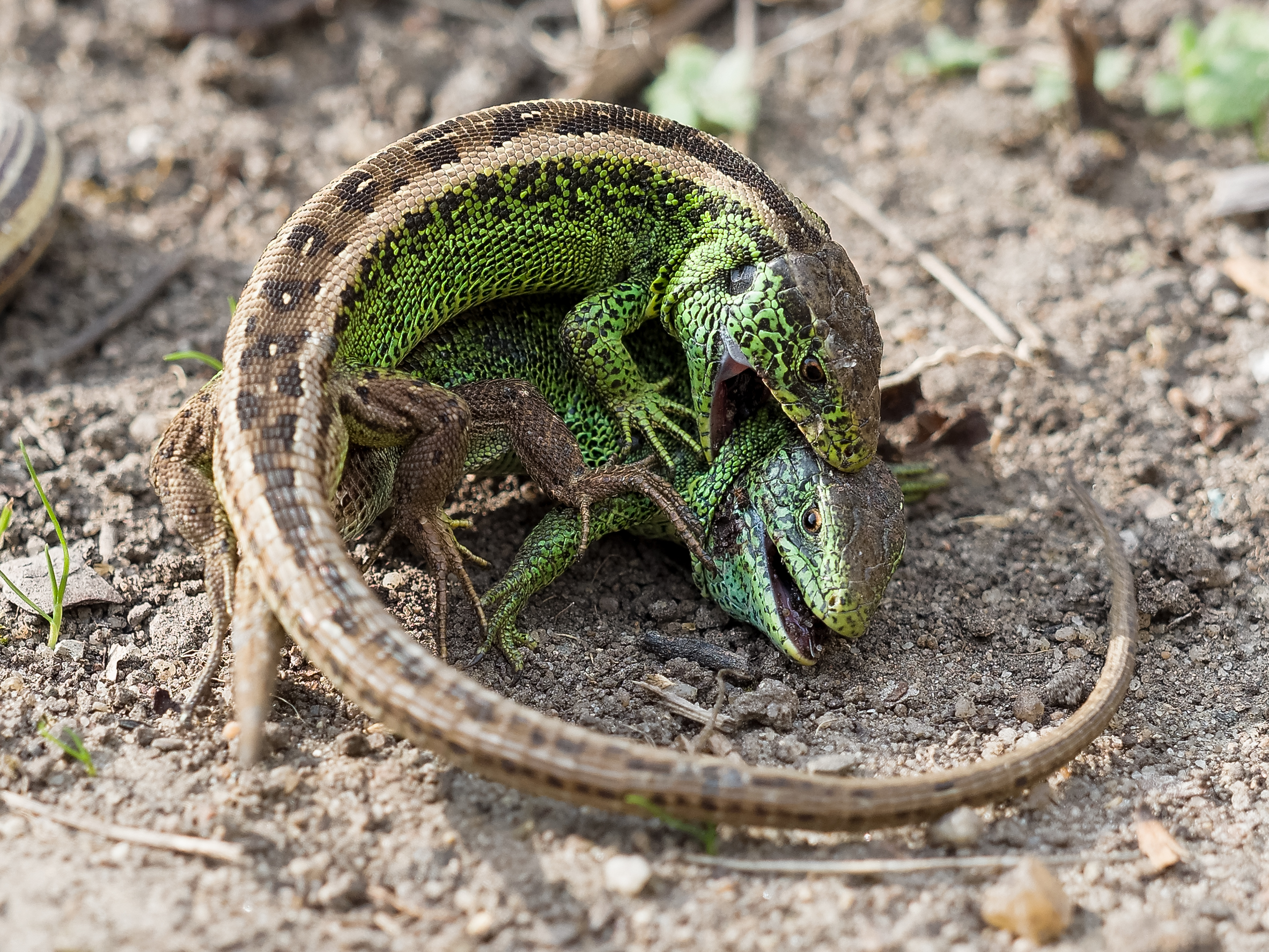
Fighting male sand lizards

Most social interactions among lizards are between breeding individuals. Territoriality is common and is correlated with species that use sit-and-wait hunting strategies. Males establish and maintain territories that contain resources that attract females and which they defend from other males. Important resources include basking, feeding, and nesting sites as well as refuges from predators. The habitat of a species affects the structure of territories, for example, rock lizards have territories atop rocky outcrops. Some species may aggregate in groups, enhancing vigilance and lessening the risk of predation for individuals, particularly for juveniles. Agonistic behaviour typically occurs between sexually mature males over territory or mates and may involve displays, posturing, chasing, grappling and biting.

=== Communication ===
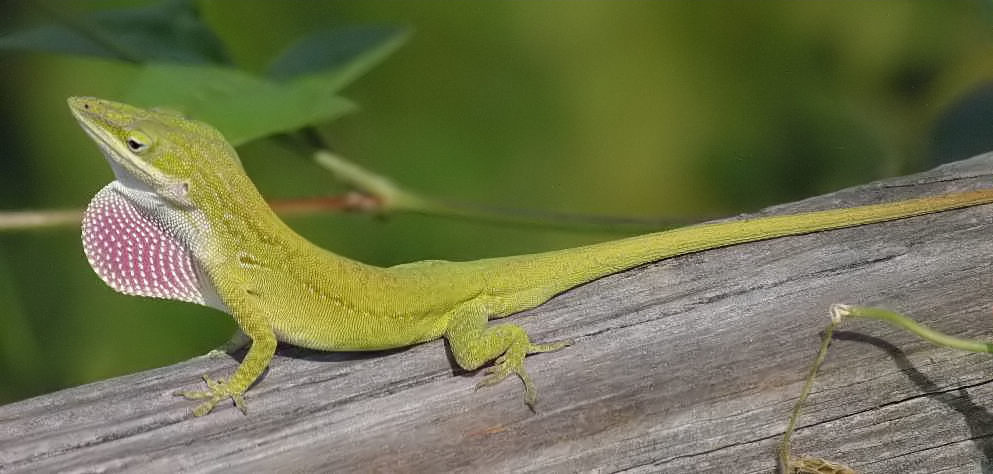
A green anole (Anolis carolinensis) signalling with its extended dewlap

Lizards signal both to attract mates and to intimidate rivals. Visual displays include body postures and inflation, push-ups, bright colours, mouth gaping and tail wagging. Male anoles and iguanas have dewlaps or skin flaps which come in various sizes, colours and patterns and the expansion of the dewlap as well as head-bobs and body movements add to the visual signals. Some species have deep blue dewlaps and communicate with ultraviolet signals. Blue-tongued skinks will flash their tongues as a threat display. Chameleons are known to change their complex colour patterns when communicating, particularly during agonistic encounters. They tend to show brighter colours when displaying aggression and darker colours when they submit or "give up".

Several gecko species are brightly coloured; some species tilt their bodies to display their coloration. In certain species, brightly coloured males turn dull when not in the presence of rivals or females. While it is usually males that display, in some species females also use such communication. In the bronze anole, head-bobs are a common form of communication among females, the speed and frequency varying with age and territorial status. Chemical cues or pheromones are also important in communication. Males typically direct signals at rivals, while females direct them at potential mates. Lizards may be able to recognise individuals of the same species by their scent.

Tokay gecko mating call
Mating call of a male Tokay gecko

Acoustic communication is less common in lizards. Hissing, a typical reptilian sound, is mostly produced by larger species as part of a threat display, accompanying gaping jaws. Some groups, particularly geckos, snake-lizards, and some iguanids, can produce more complex sounds and vocal apparatuses have independently evolved in different groups. These sounds are used for courtship, territorial defense and in distress, and include clicks, squeaks, barks and growls. The mating call of the male tokay gecko is heard as "tokay-tokay!". Tactile communication involves individuals rubbing against each other, either in courtship or in aggression. Some chameleon species communicate with one another by vibrating the substrate that they are standing on, such as a tree branch or leaf.

=== Defence ===
Lizards are normally quick and agile to easily outrun attackers.

== Ecology ==
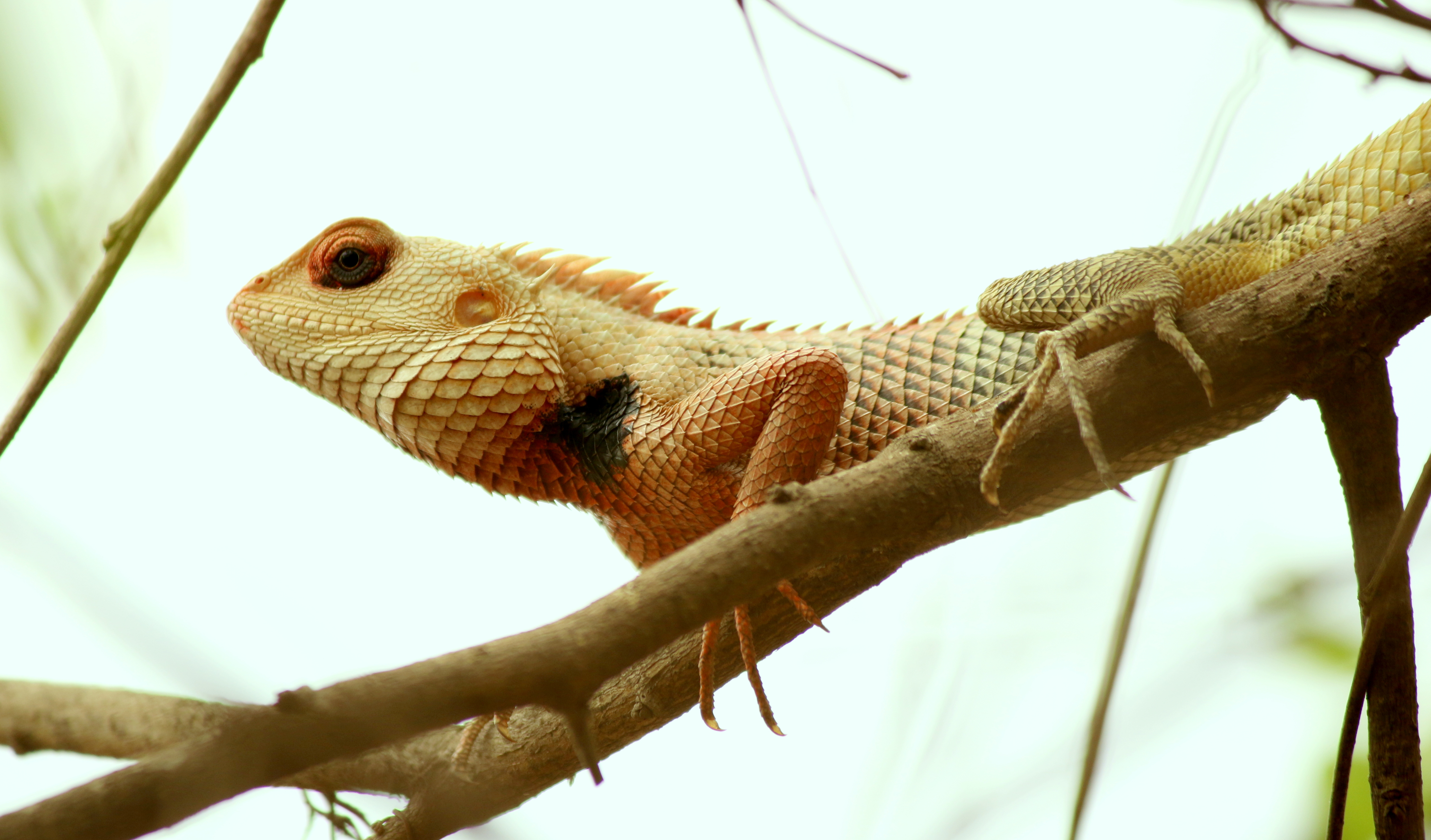
Lizard in tree. Many species are tree-dwelling

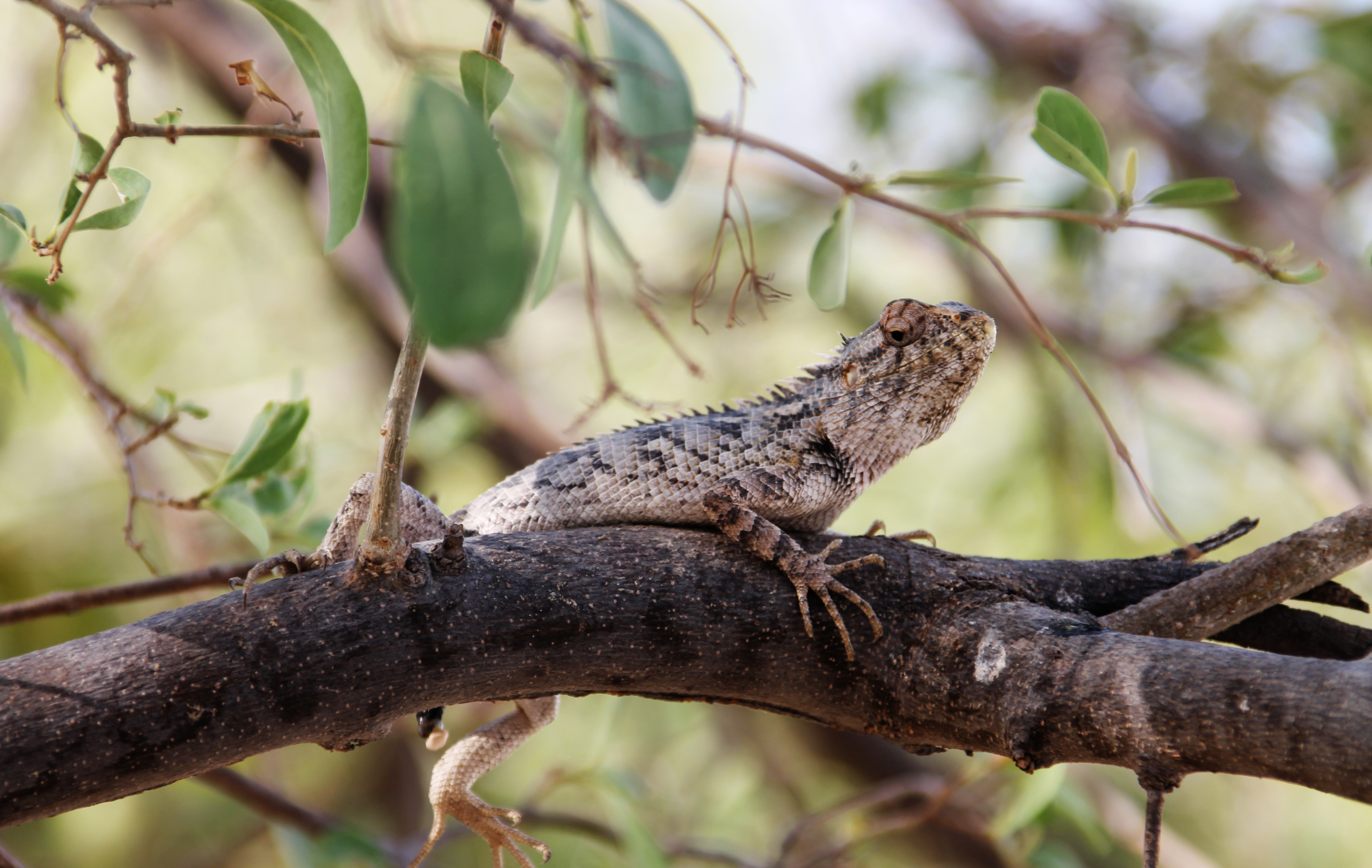
A lizard from Thar desert

=== Distribution and habitat ===
Lizards are found worldwide, excluding the far north and Antarctica, and some islands. They can be found in elevations from sea level to 5,000 m (16,000 ft). They prefer warmer, tropical climates but are adaptable and can live in all but the most extreme environments. Lizards also exploit a number of habitats; most primarily live on the ground, but others may live in rocks, on trees, underground and even in water. The marine iguana is adapted for life in the sea.

=== Diet ===
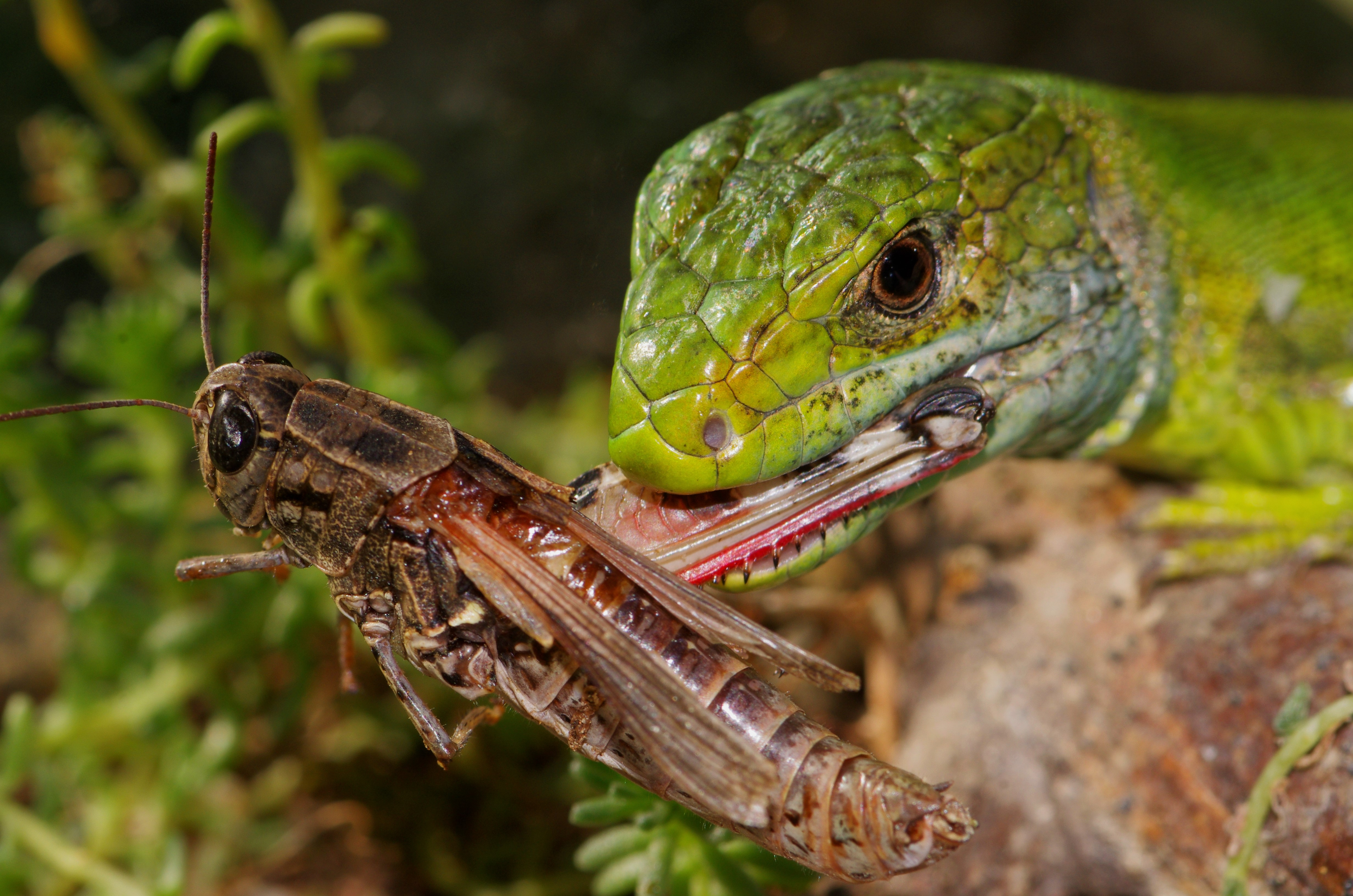
Western green lizard ambushes its grasshopper prey.

The majority of lizard species are predatory and the most common prey items are small, terrestrial invertebrates, particularly insects. Many species are sit-and-wait predators though others may be more active foragers. Chameleons prey on numerous insect species, such as beetles, grasshoppers and winged termites as well as spiders. They rely on persistence and ambush to capture these prey. An individual perches on a branch and stays perfectly still, with only its eyes moving. When an insect lands, the chameleon focuses its eyes on the target and slowly moves toward it before projecting its long sticky tongue which, when hauled back, brings the attached prey with it. Geckos feed on crickets, beetles, termites and moths.

Termites are an important part of the diets of some species of Autarchoglossa, since, as social insects, they can be found in large numbers in one spot. Ants may form a prominent part of the diet of some lizards, particularly among the lacertas. Horned lizards are also well known for specializing on ants. Due to their small size and indigestible chitin, ants must be consumed in large amounts, and ant-eating lizards have larger stomachs than even herbivorous ones. Species of skink and alligator lizards eat snails and their power jaws and molar-like teeth are adapted for breaking the shells.

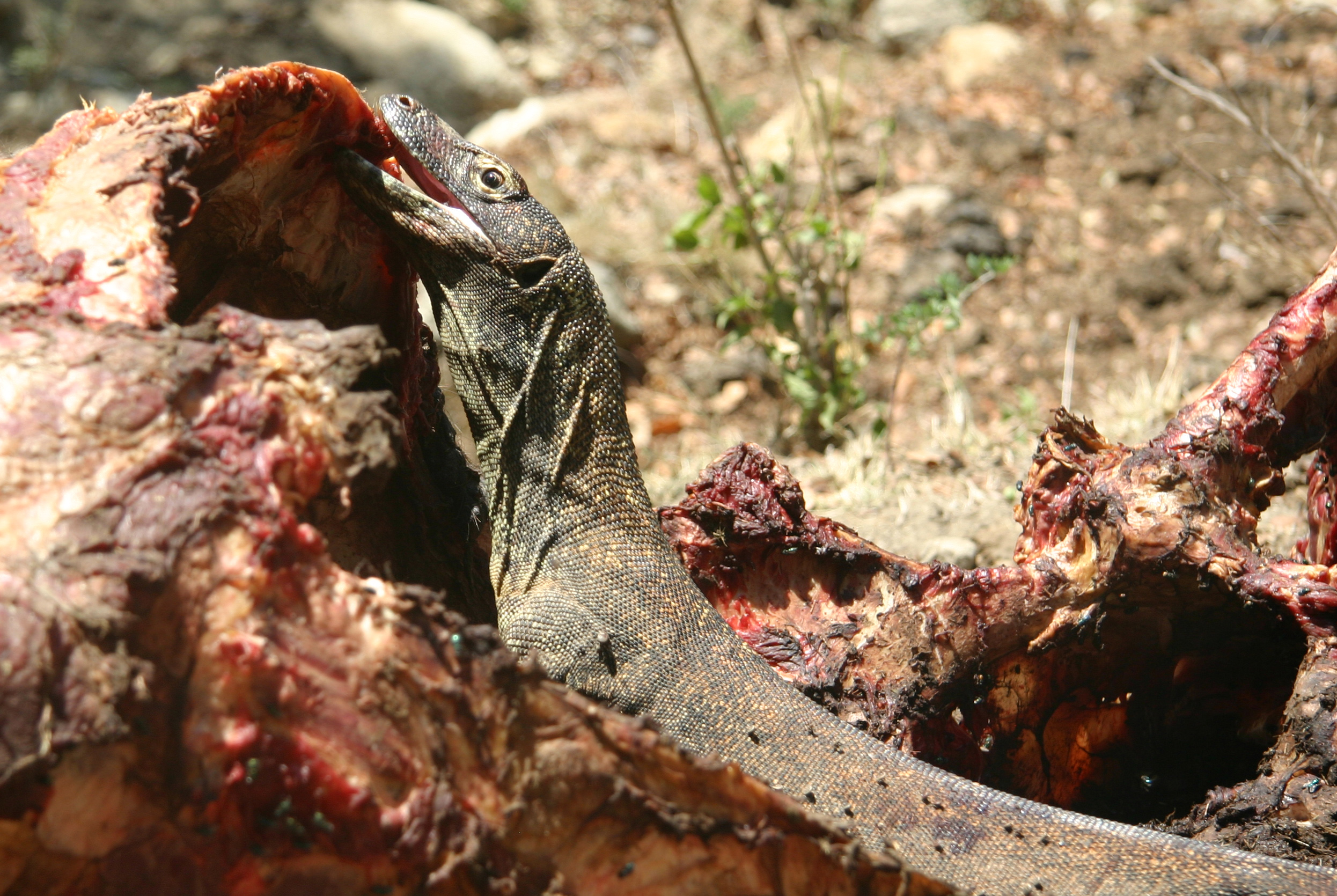
Young Komodo dragon feeding on a water buffalo carcass

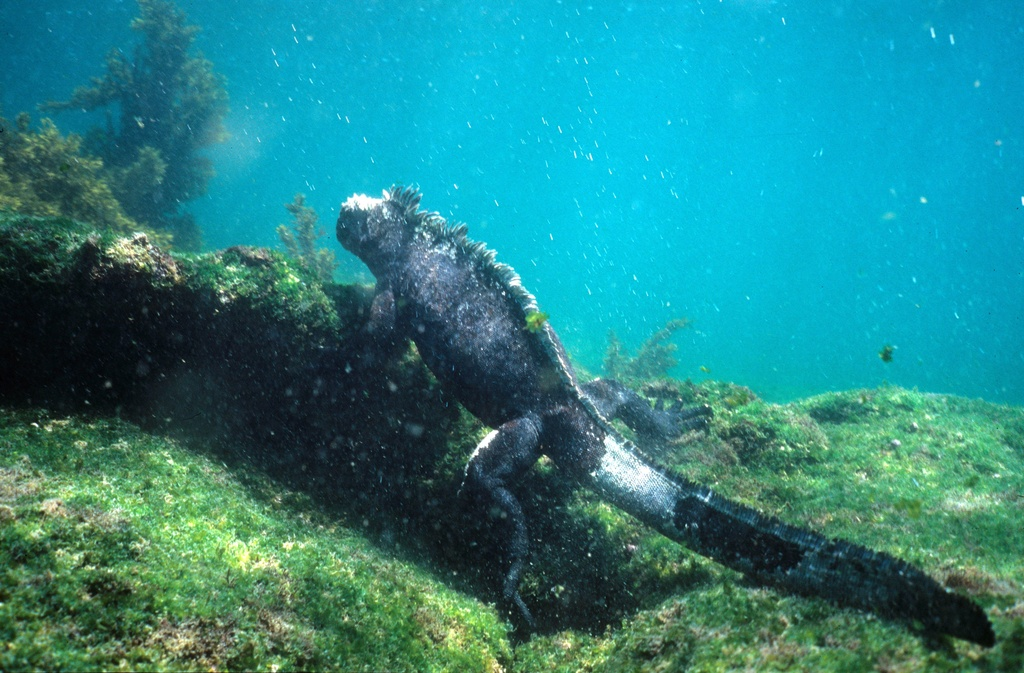
Marine iguana foraging under water at Galápagos Islands, Ecuador.

Larger species, such as monitor lizards, can feed on larger prey including fish, frogs, birds, mammals and other reptiles. Prey may be swallowed whole and torn into smaller pieces. Both bird and reptile eggs may also be consumed as well. Gila monsters and beaded lizards climb trees to reach both the eggs and young of birds. Despite being venomous, these species rely on their strong jaws to kill prey. Mammalian prey typically consists of rodents and leporids; the Komodo dragon can kill prey as large as water buffalo. Dragons are prolific scavengers, and a single decaying carcass can attract several from 2 km (1.2 mi) away. A 50 kg (110 lb) dragon is capable of consuming a 31 kg (68 lb) carcass in 17 minutes.

Around 2 percent of lizard species, including many iguanids, are herbivores. Adults of these species eat plant parts like flowers, leaves, stems and fruit, while juveniles eat more insects. Plant parts can be hard to digest, and, as they get closer to adulthood, juvenile iguanas eat faeces from adults to acquire the microflora necessary for their transition to a plant-based diet. Perhaps the most herbivorous species is the marine iguana which dives 15 m (49 ft) to forage for algae, kelp and other marine plants. Some non-herbivorous species supplement their insect diet with fruit, which is easily digested.

=== Antipredator adaptations ===
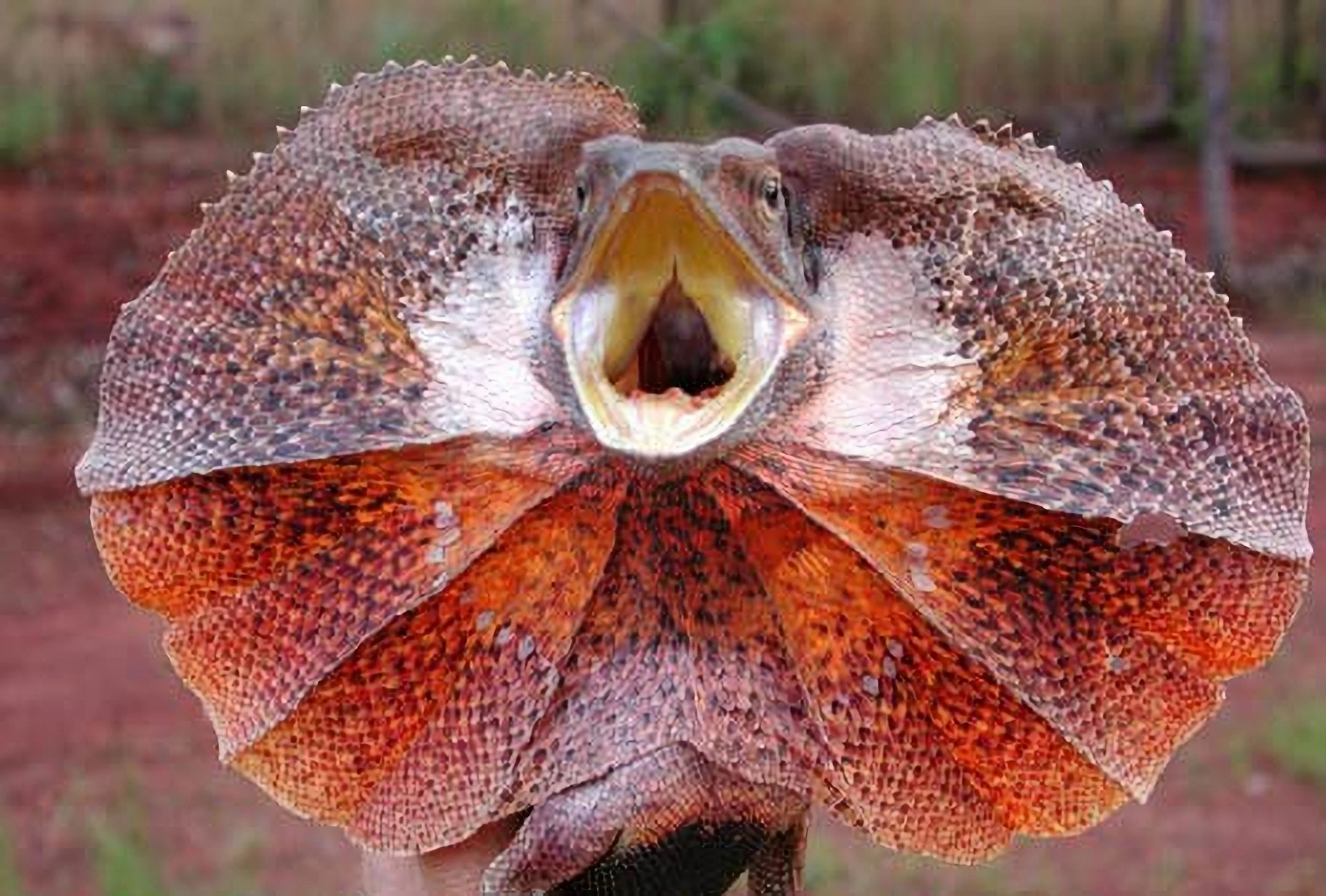
The frilled-neck lizard with fully extended frill. The frilled neck serves to make it look bigger than it actually is.

Lizards have a variety of antipredator adaptations, including running and climbing, venom, camouflage, tail autotomy, and reflex bleeding.

==== Camouflage ====
Lizards exploit a variety of different camouflage methods. Many lizards are disruptively patterned. In some species, such as Aegean wall lizards, individuals vary in colour, and select rocks which best match their own colour to minimise the risk of being detected by predators. The Moorish gecko is able to change colour for camouflage: when a light-coloured gecko is placed on a dark surface, it darkens within an hour to match the environment. The chameleons in general use their ability to change their coloration for signalling rather than camouflage, but some species such as Smith's dwarf chameleon do use active colour change for camouflage purposes.

The flat-tail horned lizard's body is coloured like its desert background, and is flattened and fringed with white scales to minimise its shadow.

==== Autotomy ====
A skink tail continuing to move after autotomy

Many lizards, including geckos and skinks, are capable of shedding their tails (autotomy). The detached tail, sometimes brilliantly coloured, continues to writhe after detaching, distracting the predator's attention from the fleeing prey. Lizards partially regenerate their tails over a period of weeks. Some 326 genes are involved in regenerating lizard tails. The fish-scale gecko Geckolepis megalepis sheds patches of skin and scales if grabbed.

==== Escape, playing dead, and reflex bleeding ====
Many lizards attempt to escape from danger by running to a place of safety; (Note: The BBC's 2016 Planet Earth II showed a sequence of newly-hatched marine iguanas running to the sea past a waiting crowd of racer snakes. It was edited for dramatic effect but the sections were all genuine.) for example, wall lizards can run up walls and hide in holes or cracks. Horned lizards adopt differing defences for specific predators. They may play dead to deceive a predator that has caught them; attempt to outrun the rattlesnake, which does not pursue prey; but stay still, relying on their cryptic coloration, for Masticophis whip snakes which can catch even swift prey. If caught, some species such as the greater short-horned lizard puff themselves up, making their bodies hard for a narrow-mouthed predator like a whip snake to swallow. Finally, horned lizards can squirt blood at cat and dog predators from a pouch beneath its eyes, to a distance of about two metres (6.6 feet); the blood tastes foul to these attackers.

== Evolution ==
=== Fossil history ===
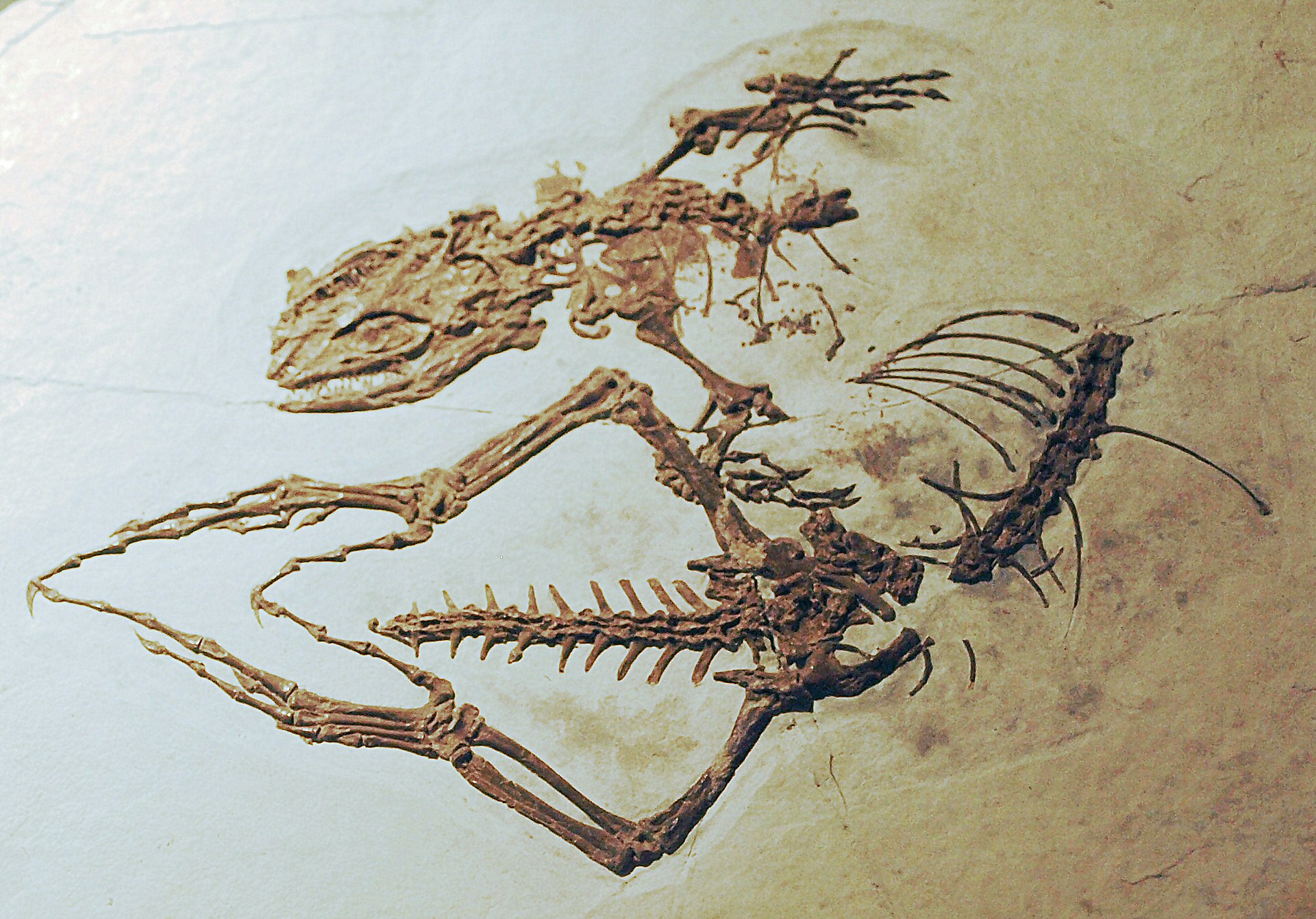
Fossil lizard Dalinghosaurus longidigitus, Early Cretaceous, China

The closest living relatives of lizards are rhynchocephalians, a once diverse order of reptiles, of which is there is now only one living species, the tuatara of New Zealand. Some reptiles from the Early and Middle Triassic, like Sophineta and Megachirella, are suggested to be stem-group squamates, more closely related to modern lizards than rhynchocephalians, however, their position is disputed, with some studies recovering them as less closely related to squamates than rhynchocephalians are. The oldest undisputed lizards date to the Middle Jurassic, from remains found In Europe, Asia and North Africa. Lizard morphological and ecological diversity substantially increased over the course of the Cretaceous. In the Palaeogene, lizard body sizes in North America peaked during the middle of the period.

Mosasaurs likely evolved from an extinct group of aquatic lizards known as aigialosaurs in the Early Cretaceous. Dolichosauridae is a family of Late Cretaceous aquatic varanoid lizards closely related to the mosasaurs.

=== Phylogeny ===
==== External ====
The position of the lizards and other Squamata among the reptiles was studied using fossil evidence by Rainer Schoch and Hans-Dieter Sues in 2015. Lizards form about 60% of the extant non-avian reptiles.

- Archelosauria
  - Archosauromorpha
  - Lepidosauromorpha
    - - Pantestudines
      - - †Kuehneosauridae
        - Lepidosauria
          - Rhynchocephalia
          - Squamata

==== Internal ====
Both snakes and amphisbaenians (worm lizards) are clades deep within the Squamata (the smallest clade that contains all the lizards), so "lizard" is paraphyletic. The cladogram is based on genomic analysis by Wiens and colleagues in 2012 and 2016. Excluded taxa are shown in upper case on the cladogram.

- Squamata
  - Dibamia
    Dibamidae
  - Bifurcata
    - Gekkota
      - Pygopodomorpha
        - Diplodactylidae
        - - Pygopodidae
          - Carphodactylidae
      - Gekkomorpha
        - Eublepharidae
        - Gekkonoidea
          - Sphaerodactylidae
          - - Phyllodactylidae
            - Gekkonidae
    - Unidentata
      - Scinciformata
        - Scincomorpha
          Scincidae
        - Cordylomorpha
          - Xantusiidae
          - - Gerrhosauridae
            - Cordylidae
      - Episquamata
        - Laterata
          - Teiformata
            - Gymnophthalmidae
            - Teiidae
          - Lacertibaenia
            - Lacertiformata
              Lacertidae
            - AMPHISBAENIA (worm lizards, not usually considered "true lizards")
        - Toxicofera
          - - Anguimorpha
              - Palaeoanguimorpha
                - Shinisauria
                  Shinisauridae
                - Varanoidea
                  - Lanthanotidae
                  - Varanidae
              - Neoanguimorpha
                - Helodermatoidea
                  Helodermatidae
                - - Xenosauroidea
                    Xenosauridae
                  - Anguioidea
                    - Diploglossidae
                    - - Anniellidae
                      - Anguidae
            - Iguanomorpha
              - Acrodonta
                - Chamaeleonidae
                - Agamidae
              - Pleurodonta
                - Leiocephalidae
                - - Iguanidae
                  - - - Hoplocercidae
                      - - Crotaphytidae
                        - Corytophanidae
                    - - Tropiduridae
                      - - - Phrynosomatidae
                          - - Dactyloidae
                            - Polychrotidae
                        - - Liolaemidae
                          - - Leiosauridae
                            - Opluridae
          - SERPENTES (snakes, not usually considered to be lizards)

=== Taxonomy ===
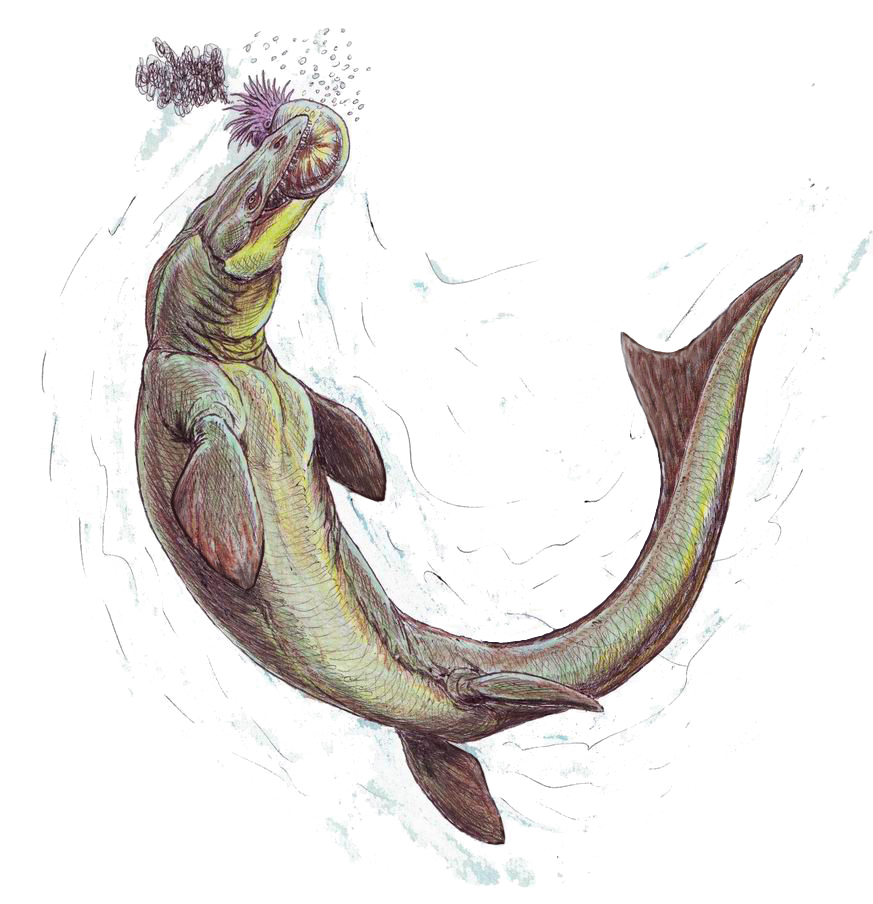
Artistic restoration of a mosasaur, Prognathodon

In the 13th century, lizards were recognized in Europe as part of a broad category of reptiles that consisted of a miscellany of egg-laying creatures, including "snakes, various fantastic monsters, […], assorted amphibians, and worms", as recorded by Vincent of Beauvais in his Mirror of Nature. The seventeenth century saw changes in this loose description. The name Sauria was coined by James Macartney (1802); it was the Latinisation of the French name Sauriens, coined by Alexandre Brongniart (1800) for an order of reptiles in the classification proposed by the author, containing lizards and crocodilians, later discovered not to be each other's closest relatives. Later authors used the term "Sauria" in a more restricted sense, i.e. as a synonym of Lacertilia, a suborder of Squamata that includes all lizards but excludes snakes. This classification is rarely used today because Sauria so-defined is a paraphyletic group. It was defined as a clade by Jacques Gauthier, Arnold G. Kluge and Timothy Rowe (1988) as the group containing the most recent common ancestor of archosaurs and lepidosaurs (the groups containing crocodiles and lizards, as per Mcartney's original definition) and all its descendants. A different definition was formulated by Michael deBraga and Olivier Rieppel (1997), who defined Sauria as the clade containing the most recent common ancestor of Choristodera, Archosauromorpha, Lepidosauromorpha and all their descendants. However, these uses have not gained wide acceptance among specialists.

Suborder Lacertilia (Sauria) – (lizards)

- Family †Bavarisauridae
- Family †Eichstaettisauridae
- Infraorder Iguanomorpha
  - Family †Arretosauridae
  - Family †Euposauridae
  - Family Corytophanidae (casquehead lizards)
  - Family Iguanidae (iguanas and spinytail iguanas)
  - Family Phrynosomatidae (earless, spiny, tree, side-blotched and horned lizards)
  - Family Polychrotidae (anoles)
    - Family Leiosauridae (see Polychrotinae)
  - Family Tropiduridae (neotropical ground lizards)
    - Family Liolaemidae (see Tropidurinae)
    - Family Leiocephalidae (see Tropidurinae)
  - Family Crotaphytidae (collared and leopard lizards)
  - Family Opluridae (Madagascar iguanids)
  - Family Hoplocercidae (wood lizards, clubtails)
  - Family †Priscagamidae
  - Family †Isodontosauridae
  - Family Agamidae (agamas, frilled lizards)
  - Family Chamaeleonidae (chameleons)
- Infraorder Gekkota
  - Family Gekkonidae (geckos)
  - Family Pygopodidae (legless geckos)
  - Family Dibamidae (blind lizards)
- Infraorder Scincomorpha
  - Family †Paramacellodidae
  - Family †Slavoiidae
  - Family Scincidae (skinks)
  - Family Cordylidae (spinytail lizards)
  - Family Gerrhosauridae (plated lizards)
  - Family Xantusiidae (night lizards)
  - Family Lacertidae (wall lizards or true lizards)
  - Family †Mongolochamopidae
  - Family †Adamisauridae
  - Family Teiidae (tegus and whiptails)
  - Family Gymnophthalmidae (spectacled lizards)
- Infraorder Diploglossa
  - Family Anguidae (slowworms, glass lizards)
  - Family Anniellidae (American legless lizards)
  - Family Xenosauridae (knob-scaled lizards)
- Infraorder Platynota (Varanoidea)
  - Family Varanidae (monitor lizards)
  - Family Lanthanotidae (earless monitor lizards)
  - Family Helodermatidae (Gila monsters and beaded lizards)
  - Family †Mosasauridae (marine lizards)

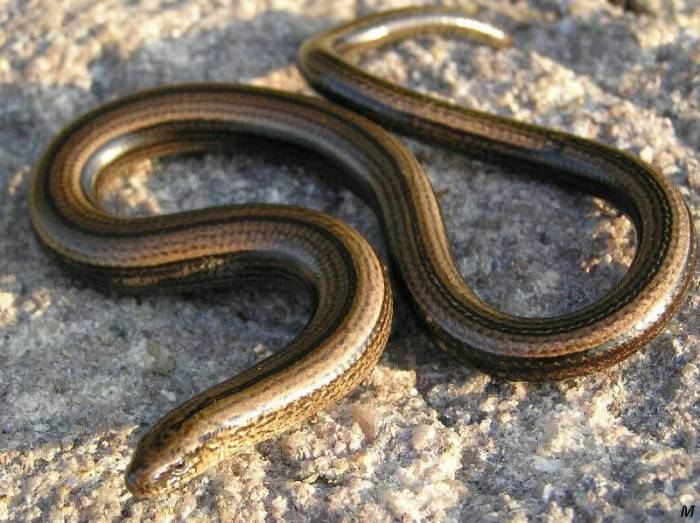
The slowworms, Anguis, are among over twenty groups of lizards that have convergently evolved a legless body plan.

=== Convergence ===
Lizards have frequently evolved convergently, with multiple groups independently developing similar morphology and ecological niches. Anolis ecomorphs have become a model system in evolutionary biology for studying convergence. Lizard leglessness or limb reduction has developed independently over two dozen times across lizard evolution, including in the Anniellidae, Anguidae, Cordylidae, Dibamidae, Gymnophthalmidae, Pygopodidae, and Scincidae; snakes are just the most famous and species-rich group of Squamata to have followed this path.

== Relationship with humans ==
=== Interactions and uses by humans ===
Most lizard species are harmless to humans. Only the largest lizard species, the Komodo dragon, which reaches 3.3 m (11 ft) in length and weighs up to 166 kg (366 lb), has been known to stalk, attack, and, on occasion, kill humans. An eight-year-old Indonesian boy died from blood loss after an attack in 2007.

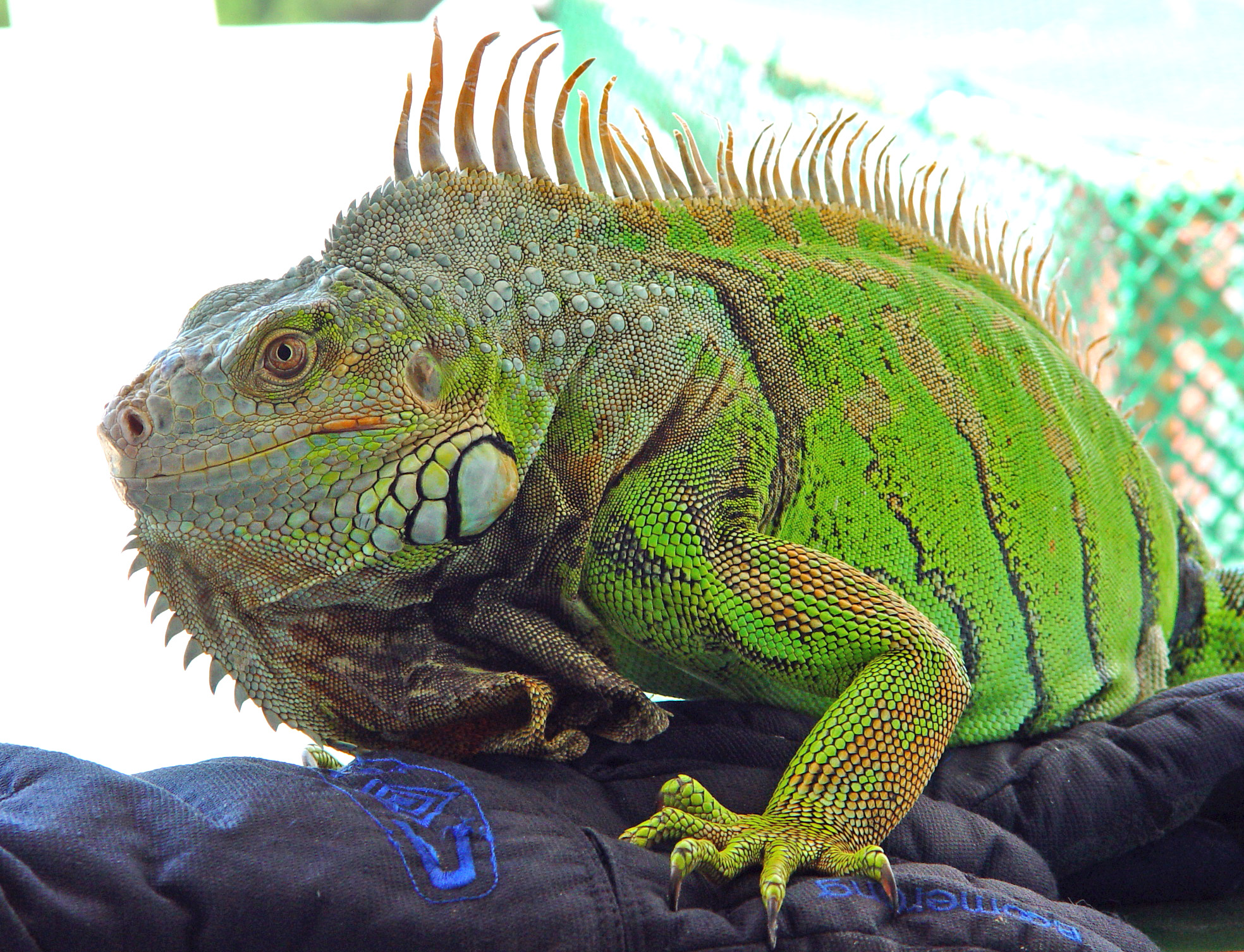
Green iguanas (Iguana iguana), are popular pets.

Numerous species of lizard are kept as pets, including bearded dragons, iguanas, anoles, and geckos (such as the popular leopard gecko). Monitor lizards such as the savannah monitor and tegus such as the Argentine tegu and red tegu are also kept.

Green iguanas are eaten in Central America, where they are sometimes referred to as "chicken of the tree" after their habit of resting in trees and their supposedly chicken-like taste, while spiny-tailed lizards are eaten in Africa. In North Africa, Uromastyx species are considered dhaab or 'fish of the desert' and eaten by nomadic tribes.

Red tegu drinking water out of a dispenser.

Lizards such as the Gila monster produce toxins with medical applications. Gila toxin reduces plasma glucose; the substance is now synthesized for use in the anti-diabetes drug exenatide (Byetta). Another toxin from Gila monster saliva has been studied for use as an anti-Alzheimer's drug.

=== In culture ===
Lizards appear in myths and folktales around the world. In Australian Aboriginal mythology, Tarrotarro, the lizard god, split the human race into male and female, and gave people the ability to express themselves in art. Lizard spirits named Moʻo feature in Hawaiian mythology and other cultures in Polynesia. In the Amazon, the lizard is the king of beasts, while among the Bantu of Africa, the god uNkulunkulu sent a chameleon to tell humans they would live forever, but the chameleon was held up, and another lizard brought a different message, that the time of humanity was limited. A popular legend in Maharashtra tells the tale of how a common Indian monitor, with ropes attached, was used to scale the walls of the fort in the Battle of Sinhagad.

Lizards in many cultures share the symbolism of snakes, especially as an emblem of resurrection. This may have derived from their regular molting. The motif of lizards on Christian candle holders probably alludes to the same symbolism. According to Jack Tresidder, in Egypt and the Classical world, they were beneficial emblems, linked with wisdom. In African, Aboriginal and Melanesian folklore they are linked to cultural heroes or ancestral figures.
