= Unidentata =

Unidentata Temporal range: Middle Jurassic – present, 170–0 Ma

Scientific classification
- Kingdom: Animalia
- Phylum: Chordata
- Class: Reptilia
- Order: Squamata
- Clade: Bifurcata
- Clade: Unidentata; Vidal & Hedges, 2005

Subgroups
- Scinciformata; Episquamata

Clade of squamate reptiles

Unidentata is a clade of squamate reptiles that includes all living squamates except dibamids and gekkotans (geckos and their relatives). The clade was named by Nicolas Vidal and S. Blair Hedges in 2005 as part of a comprehensive reclassification of squamate phylogeny based on molecular data. The name derives from Latin uni- ("one") and dentata ("toothed"), referring to the single median egg tooth that is a shared characteristic (synapomorphy) of the group, in contrast to the paired egg teeth found in the more basal dibamids and gekkotans. Unidentata is a subclade of Bifurcata and is divided into two major subgroups: Scinciformata and Episquamata.

== Description ==
Members of Unidentata are united by the possession of a single, unpaired, median egg tooth, as opposed to the paired egg teeth present in Dibamidae and Gekkota. The egg tooth is a true tooth that develops on the premaxilla and is used by hatchlings to cut through the eggshell during hatching. In unidentatans, the single egg tooth develops from one tooth germ, though some evidence suggests that, in at least some lineages, the primordium of a second (left) egg tooth germ is suppressed during embryonic development, with the right germ migrating to a median position. The paired egg teeth of gekkotans and dibamids represent the plesiomorphic (ancestral) condition for squamates.

Compared to gekkotans, members of Unidentata are generally characterised by more active foraging strategies, higher metabolic rates, and greater reliance on vomeronasal rather than purely olfactory or visual prey discrimination. The tongues of unidentatans tend to be more deeply forked than those of gekkotans, and vomeronasal prey detection becomes increasingly developed in the more derived subclade Episquamata.

The group encompasses an extraordinary range of body forms and ecological strategies, including limbless burrowing amphisbaenians, legless snakes, agile lacertid lizards, heavily armoured cordylids, large predatory monitor lizards, and arboreal iguanians and chameleons.

== Taxonomy ==
=== History ===
Prior to the molecular phylogenetic revolution in squamate systematics, the traditional classification divided squamates into Iguania (considered basal) and Scleroglossa (all other squamates), with Scleroglossa further subdivided into Gekkota and Autarchoglossa. Autarchoglossa (meaning "free-tongued") roughly corresponded in content to what would become Unidentata, but excluded the Iguania, which were thought to be primitive.

Molecular analyses by Vidal and Hedges (2005), using DNA sequences from nine nuclear protein-coding genes, dramatically altered this picture. Iguanians were found to be nested deep within the squamate tree, forming part of the derived clade Toxicofera together with Anguimorpha and snakes, rather than being basal. This rendered both Scleroglossa and Autarchoglossa paraphyletic in the molecular topology. Because redefining Autarchoglossa to include Iguania would have conflicted with the etymological meaning of the name ("free-tongued", a characteristic not shared by iguanians), Vidal and Hedges erected the new name Unidentata, which refers to a morphological character - the single egg tooth - that is shared by all members of the group, including iguanians.

=== Support ===
The monophyly of Unidentata has been broadly supported by subsequent large-scale molecular studies. Pyron and colleagues (2013) included 4,161 squamate species in a phylogenetic analysis based on 12 genes and confirmed the higher-level topology in which gekkotans are placed outside Unidentata. Zheng and Wiens (2016) combined phylogenomic and supermatrix data for 52 genes and 4,162 species, further corroborating these relationships. A genomic-scale anchored phylogenomics study by Burbrink and colleagues (2020), sampling 289 species and hundreds of loci, found unambiguous support (posterior probability of 1.0) for the major groups within this arrangement, including Unidentata, Episquamata, Toxicofera, and Laterata.

=== Classification ===
Unidentata contains two principal subgroups:

- Scinciformata – includes the families Scincidae (skinks), Xantusiidae (night lizards), Gerrhosauridae (plated lizards), and Cordylidae (girdled lizards)
- Episquamata – the more derived subclade, further subdivided into:
  - Laterata – comprising Teiformata (Teiidae and Gymnophthalmidae) and Lacertibaenia (Lacertidae and Amphisbaenia)
  - Toxicofera – comprising Iguania, Anguimorpha, and Serpentes (snakes), united by the presence of toxin-secreting oral glands
