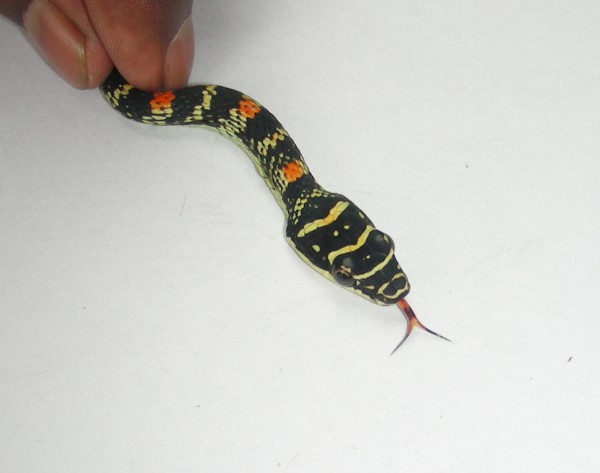
- Chrysopelea ornata displaying forked tongue

Scientific classification
- Kingdom: Animalia
- Phylum: Chordata
- Class: Reptilia
- Order: Squamata
- Clade: Bifurcata; Vidal & Hedges, 2005

= Bifurcata =

Clade of reptiles

Bifurcata is a clade of squamate reptiles containing all living squamates except the dibamids. The group was named by Nicolas Vidal and S. Blair Hedges in 2005 as part of a major reclassification of squamate phylogeny based on molecular data. The name derives from Latin bifurcatus ("split" or "forked"), referring to the bifurcated tongue that is a shared characteristic of all members of this clade. Bifurcata comprises two major subclades: Gekkota (geckos and their relatives) and Unidentata (all remaining squamates).

== Description ==
Members of Bifurcata are united by the possession of a bifurcated (forked) tongue, in contrast to the Dibamidae, which are placed as the sister group to Bifurcata at the base of the squamate tree. The forked tongue is functionally associated with the evolution of chemical prey discrimination. In basal bifurcatans such as gekkotans, prey discrimination relies mostly on olfactory and visual cues, whereas more derived members within Unidentata use increasingly developed vomeronasal organs and deeply forked tongues for vomeronasal prey discrimination.

Members of this clade exhibit enormous morphological and ecological diversity, ranging from small nocturnal geckos to large monitor lizards, limbless amphisbaenians, and all snakes.

== Taxonomy ==
The clade Bifurcata was erected by Vidal and Hedges in 2005 in a study that analysed DNA sequences from nine nuclear protein-coding genes for 19 taxa representing all major squamate lineages. Their analysis produced a phylogeny that differed substantially from the traditional morphology-based classification, which had divided squamates into Iguania and Scleroglossa. In the molecular phylogeny, Dibamidae was recovered as the most basal squamate lineage, with all other squamates forming the clade Bifurcata. Zheng and Wiens (2016) combined phylogenomic and supermatrix approaches using 52 genes and 4,162 species, further corroborating these relationships. A genomic-scale analysis by Burbrink and colleagues (2020) using anchored phylogenomics for 289 species found unambiguous support for the major clades within the molecular squamate phylogeny, including Unidentata, Episquamata, and Toxicofera.

However, the exact placement of Dibamidae remains somewhat uncertain. While most molecular analyses recover dibamids as the sister group to all other squamates (i.e. to Bifurcata as a whole), some studies instead place dibamids as the sister group of Gekkota, with the dibamid–gekkotan clade being sister to Unidentata.

=== Classification ===
Bifurcata contains two principal subgroups:

- Gekkota – geckos, including seven families: Carphodactylidae, Diplodactylidae, Eublepharidae, Gekkonidae, Phyllodactylidae, Pygopodidae, and Sphaerodactylidae
- Unidentata – all remaining squamates, defined by the possession of a single egg tooth (as opposed to the paired egg teeth found in dibamids and gekkotans). Unidentata is further divided into:
  - Scinciformata – Scincidae, Xantusiidae, Gerrhosauridae, and Cordylidae
  - Episquamata – subdivided into:
    - Laterata – Teiformata (Teiidae and Gymnophthalmidae) and Lacertibaenia (Lacertidae, Amphisbaenia)
    - Toxicofera – Iguania, Anguimorpha, and Serpentes (snakes)
