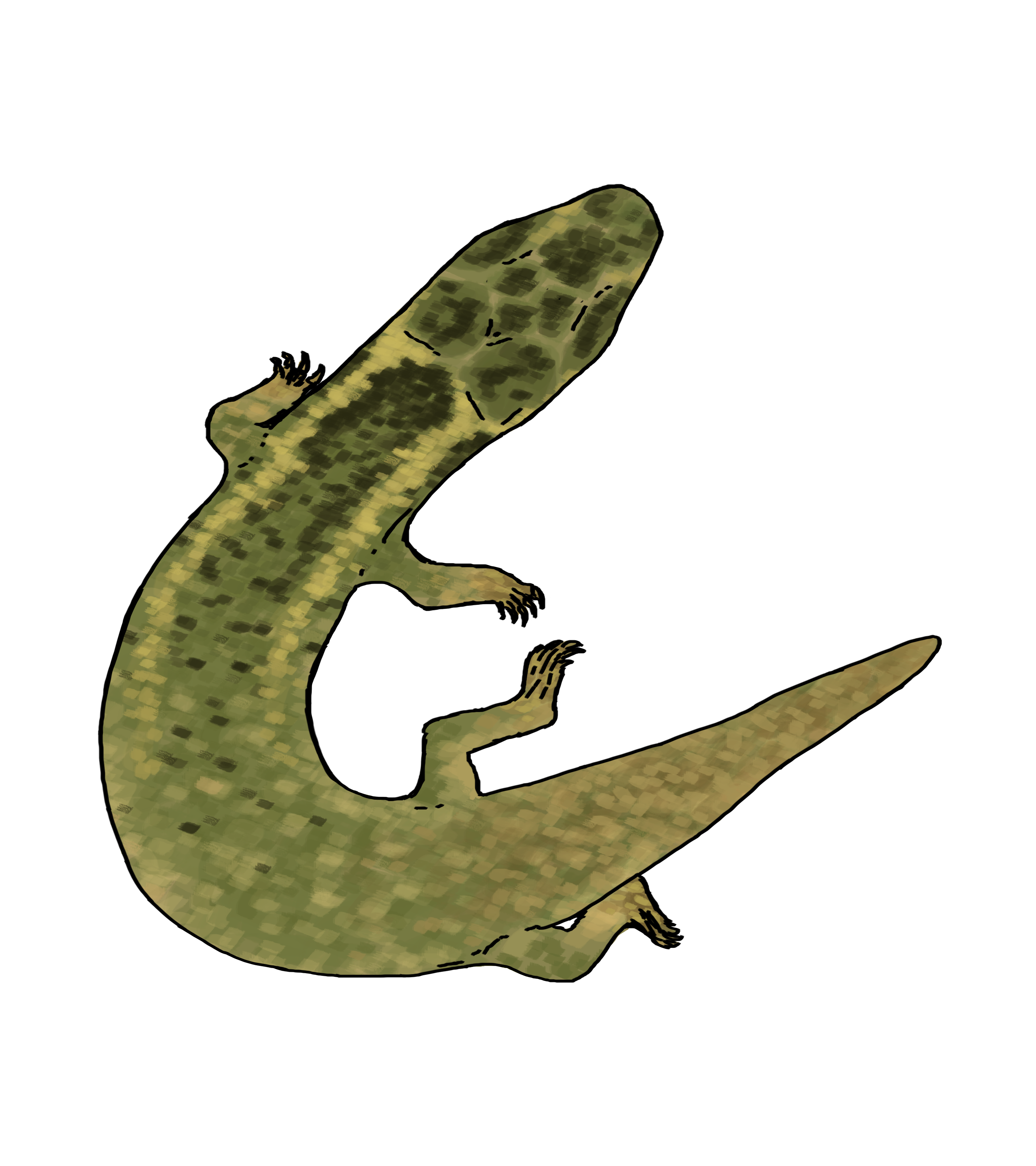

Scientific classification
- Kingdom: Animalia
- Phylum: Chordata
- Class: Reptilia
- Order: Squamata
- Clade: Lacertibaenia
- Genus: †Cryptolacerta; Müller et al., 2011

Species
- †C. hassiaca Müller et al., 2011 (type)

= Cryptolacerta =

Cryptolacerta Temporal range: Eocene, 47 Ma

Extinct genus of lizards

Cryptolacerta (Ancient Greek and Latin for "Hidden lizard" – κρυπτς or crypto meaning "hidden" and lacerta meaning "lizard") is an extinct genus of lacertoid lizard which lived during the Eocene epoch (Lutetian stage, about 47 million years ago) in what is now Germany. It is known from a nearly complete and articulated skeleton including the skull, which was found in the Messel Pit locality of Germany. Cryptolacerta was named by Johannes Müller, Christy A. Hipsley, Jason J. Head, Nikolay Kardjilov, André Hilger, Michael Wuttke and Robert R. Reisz in 2011 and the type species is Cryptolacerta hassiaca. Cladistic analysis conducted by Müller et al. suggests that Cryptolacerta is a sister taxon to Amphisbaenia. However, later studies questioned its closeness to that group, and suggested that the similarities could be convergent due to both groups having a similar burrowing lifestyle, and it may be more closely related to Lacertidae instead.
