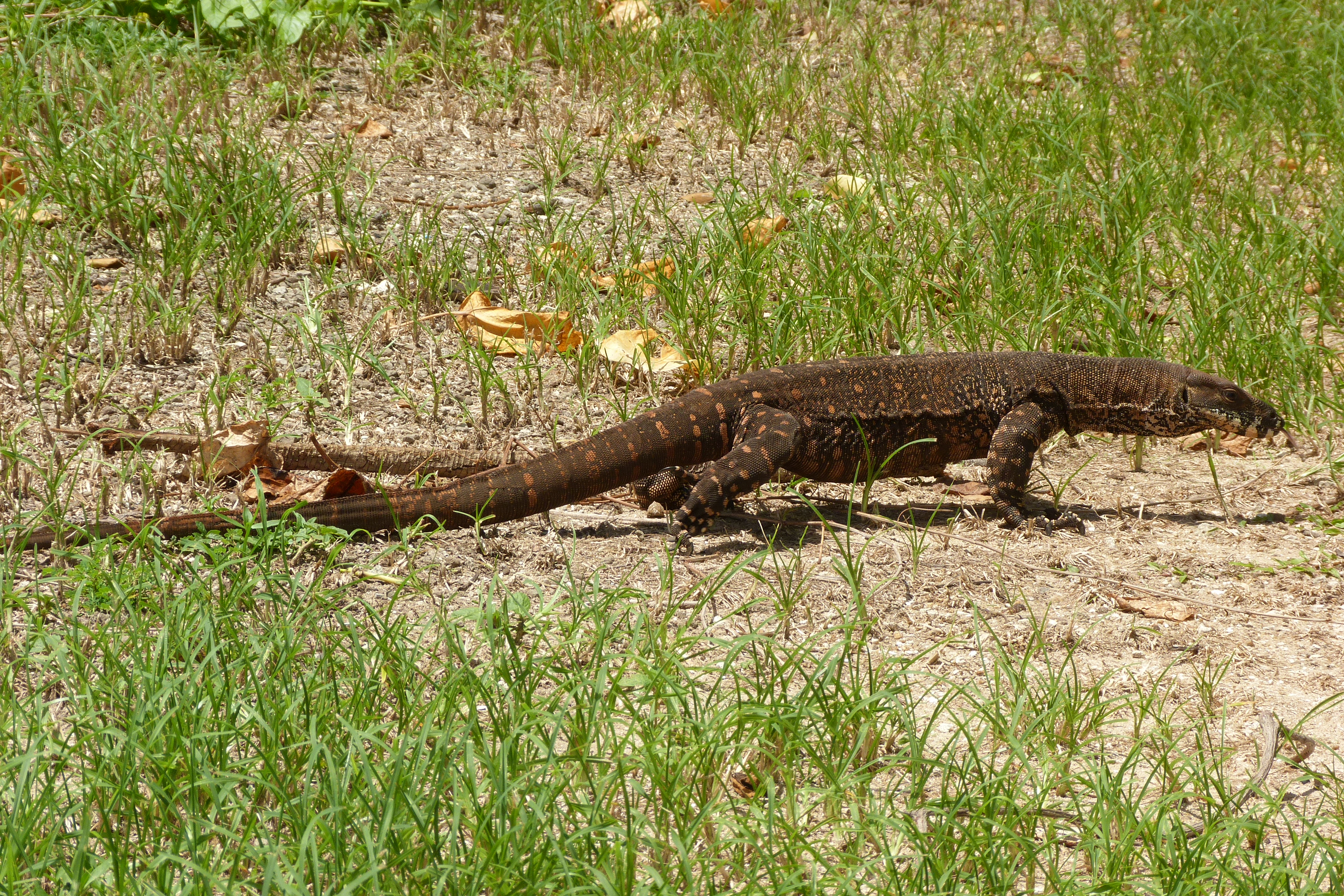
- Lace monitor (Varanus varius), an anguimorph lizard belonging to Episquamata

Scientific classification
- Kingdom: Animalia
- Phylum: Chordata
- Class: Reptilia
- Order: Squamata
- (unranked): Bifurcata
- (unranked): Unidentata
- (unranked): Episquamata Vidal & Hedges, 2005

Subgroups
- Laterata; Lacertoidea (Lacertidae, Amphisbaenia, Teiidae, Gymnophthalmidae); Toxicofera; Anguimorpha; Iguania; Serpentes

= Episquamata =

Clade of reptiles

Episquamata (meaning "top squamates") is a large clade of squamate reptiles erected by Nicolas Vidal and S. Blair Hedges in 2005 on the basis of molecular phylogenetic analysis. The group encompasses the majority of living squamate diversity, including all snakes, iguanian lizards, anguimorph lizards, amphisbaenians, lacertids, teiids, and gymnophthalmids. Episquamata is the sister group of Scincomorpha (or Scinciformata/Scincoidea), and together they form the clade Unidentata, which excludes the basally diverging dibamids and gekkotans.

The name Episquamata derives from the Greek prefix epi- ("upon, top") and Latin squamata ("scaly"), referring to the position of this clade near the top of the molecular phylogenetic tree of squamates, in contrast to the more basally branching lineages.

== Classification and phylogeny ==
=== Background ===
Traditional morphological classifications of squamates recognized a fundamental division between Iguania (iguanas, agamids, chameleons) and Scleroglossa (all other squamates), based largely on tongue morphology and prey-capture mode. However, beginning in the early 2000s, analyses of nuclear gene sequences produced a fundamentally different topology that placed Iguania in a deeply nested position within Squamata, closely allied with snakes and anguimorphs rather than as a basal lineage.

In 2005, Vidal and Hedges proposed several new clade names to reflect the molecular topology, including Episquamata for the large assemblage containing Laterata and Toxicofera. Their classification also rejected the monophyly of both Scleroglossa and Autarchoglossa, since iguanians were recovered in a highly nested position rather than at the base of Squamata.

=== Conflict with morphological analyses ===
The molecular topology that defines Episquamata differs sharply from most phylogenies based on morphological data. In particular, the inclusion of Iguania within Toxicofera—and therefore within Episquamata—contradicts the long-standing morphological placement of iguanians as the most basal squamate lineage. Similarly, the grouping of amphisbaenians with lacertids within Laterata contrasts with morphological hypotheses that allied the limbless amphisbaenians with other burrowing lineages such as dibamids or snakes.

Molecular studies have suggested that these morphological groupings may have been misled by convergent evolution associated with adaptations to burrowing and other specialized lifestyles.

== Diversity ==
Episquamata's two constituent clades, Laterata and Toxicofera, together include all snakes (approximately 3,900 species), all iguanian lizards (approximately 2,000 species), all anguimorph lizards (approximately 250 species), all lacertid lizards (approximately 340 species), all teiid and gymnophthalmid lizards (approximately 550 species), and all amphisbaenians (approximately 200 species). Members of Episquamata are found on every continent except Antarctica and occupy an extraordinary range of ecological niches, from arboreal to fossorial, aquatic to desert-dwelling, and from minute burrowing forms to large apex predators.
