= Lacertibaenia =

Scientific classification
- Kingdom: Animalia
- Phylum: Chordata
- Class: Reptilia
- Superorder: Lepidosauria
- Order: Squamata
- Clade: Lacertoidea
- Clade: Lacertibaenia; Vidal & Hedges, 2005

Subgroups
- Amphisbaenia; Lacertidae

Clade of reptiles

Lacertibaenia is a clade of squamate reptiles that unites the worm lizards (Amphisbaenia) with the true lizards (Lacertidae). The clade was named by Vidal & Hedges (2005), who recovered the group from analyses of nine nuclear protein-coding genes within their broader clade Laterata (Lacertoidea). Subsequent molecular datasets with broader gene and taxon sampling have repeatedly recovered amphisbaenians as sister to lacertids, corroborating the monophyly of Lacertibaenia. A 2024 satellite-DNA study further supported Lacertibaenia as a coherent lineage.

== Evolutionary history ==
An important fossil relevant to Lacertibaenia is the Messel fossil Cryptolacerta hassiaca, which Müller et al. (2011) interpreted as shedding light on amphisbaenian origins and supporting a close relationship with lacertids. Additional paleontological work has proposed Late Cretaceous stem-amphisbaenians (Slavoia) and explored trait evolution associated with fossoriality in worm lizards.

== Taxonomy and systematics ==
Vidal & Hedges (2005) erected Lacertibaenia within the larger clade Laterata, which they subdivided as Teiformata (Gymnophthalmidae + Teiidae) and Lacertibaenia (Amphisbaenia + Lacertidae). Their classification was refined in a later synthesis focusing on squamate molecular evolution and divergence times, and has been widely adopted in subsequent molecular phylogenies of Squamata.

Within Laterata/Lacertoidea, Teiformata is usually recovered as the sister group to Lacertibaenia. Some large-scale morphology-focused matrices have instead placed amphisbaenians in alternative positions, highlighting persistent conflict between data types and character sampling strategies.

=== Included families ===
- Amphisbaenia (worm lizards: families Amphisbaenidae, Bipedidae, Rhineuridae, Trogonophidae).
- Lacertidae (true lizards).
