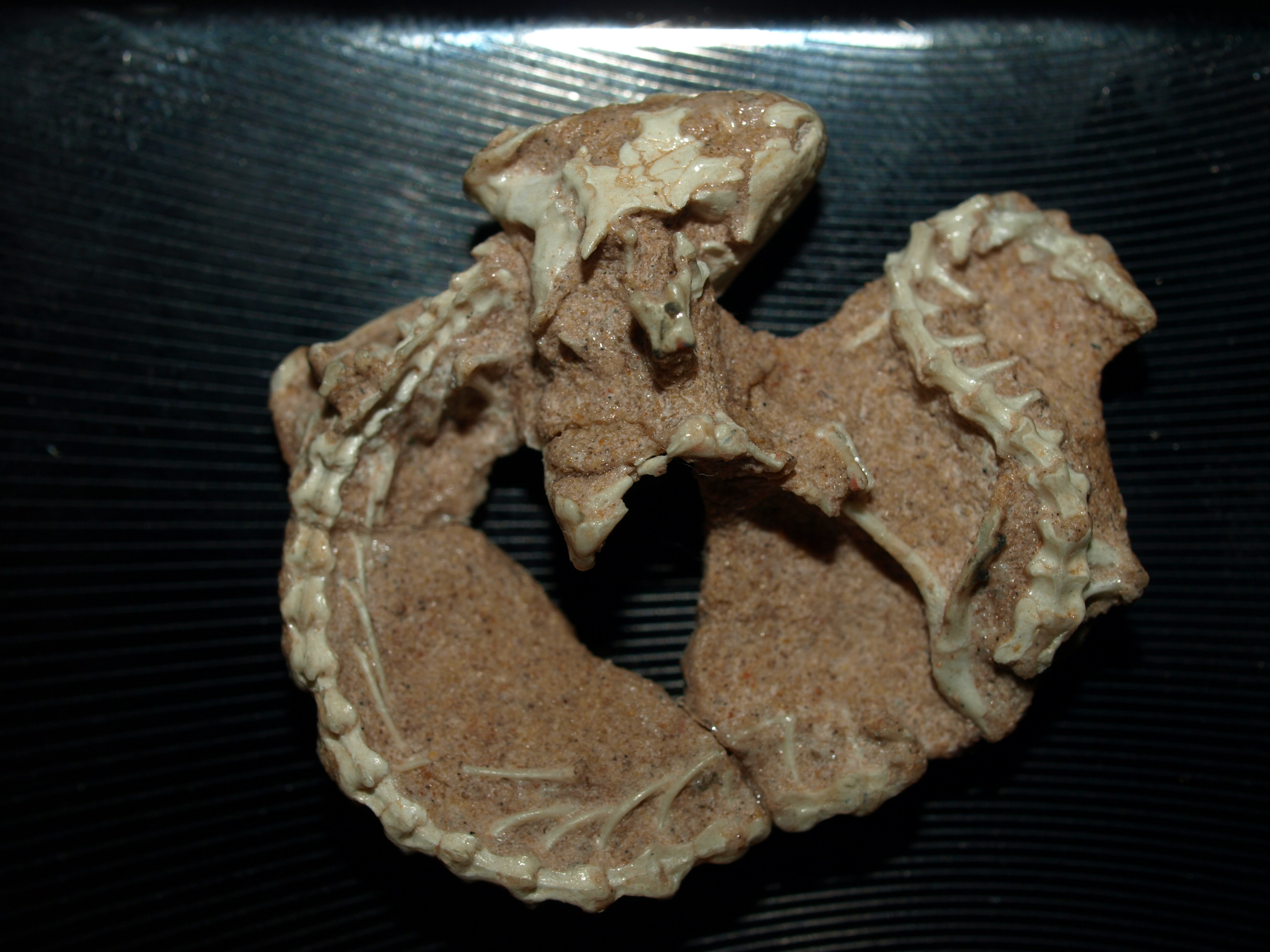
- ZPAL MgR-I/8, the holotype specimen

Scientific classification
- Kingdom: Animalia
- Phylum: Chordata
- Class: Reptilia
- Order: Squamata
- Family: †Slavoiidae
- Genus: †Slavoia; Sulimski, 1984

Type species
- †Slavoia darevskii Sulimski, 1984

= Slavoia =

Slavoia Temporal range: Early-Late Cretaceous, ~125–71 Ma

Extinct genus of lizard

Slavoia is an extinct genus of lizard from the Early Cretaceous of Mongolia (Dzunbain Formation), and Late Cretaceous of Kazakhstan (Bostobe Formation) and Mongolia (Barun Goyot Formation and Djadochta Formation).

There is only a single species S. darevskii, and Slavoia has been suggested to be the oldest known relative of amphisbaenians.

== Description ==
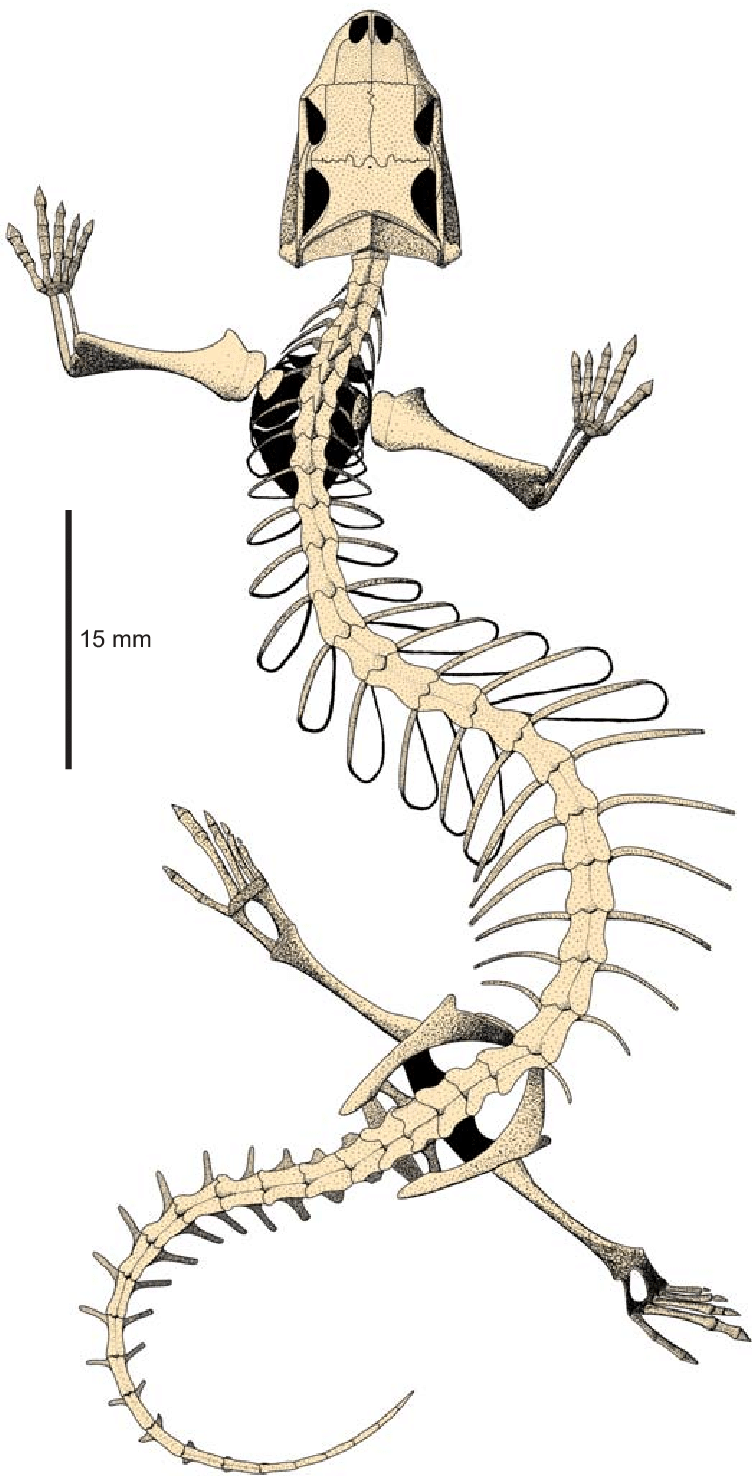
Reconstructed skeleton of S. darevskii

The structure of the skull of Slavoia suggests that it may have had a fossorial (burrowing) lifestyle, and when fully grown, it likely grew up to 12 centimetres (4.7 in) long.

Slavoia is known from several specimens including the holotype ZPAL MgR-I/8, mostly made up of incomplete skulls and skeletons, and it has therefore been possible to reconstruct its appearance. Slavoia is characterized by a skull with a very compact structure, and the orbits were small, the parietal hole was small or non-existent. The teeth, pleurodonts, were robust. The premaxilla had five teeth, while the maxilla and jaw had seven or eight. The lacrimal bone was greatly reduced, and there were 26 presacral vertebrae, equipped with an anteriorly hollow vertebral centre (procelus). Relative to most lizards, the limbs were relatively small, and the body was elongated, suggested to be adaptations for a burrowing lifestyle. The first digit of the hand had hyperphalangy (the presence of additional phalange bones).

== Classification ==
Alifanov (1993), Gao and Norell (2000), Kearney (2003) and Bolet et al. (2022) placed Slavoia within Scincomorpha. Conrad (2008) placed in a clade containing Lacertoidea+Scincomorpha. Tałanda (2016, 2017), who provided a new description of the genus, placed it as a stem-group relative of amphisbaenians within Lacertoidea.

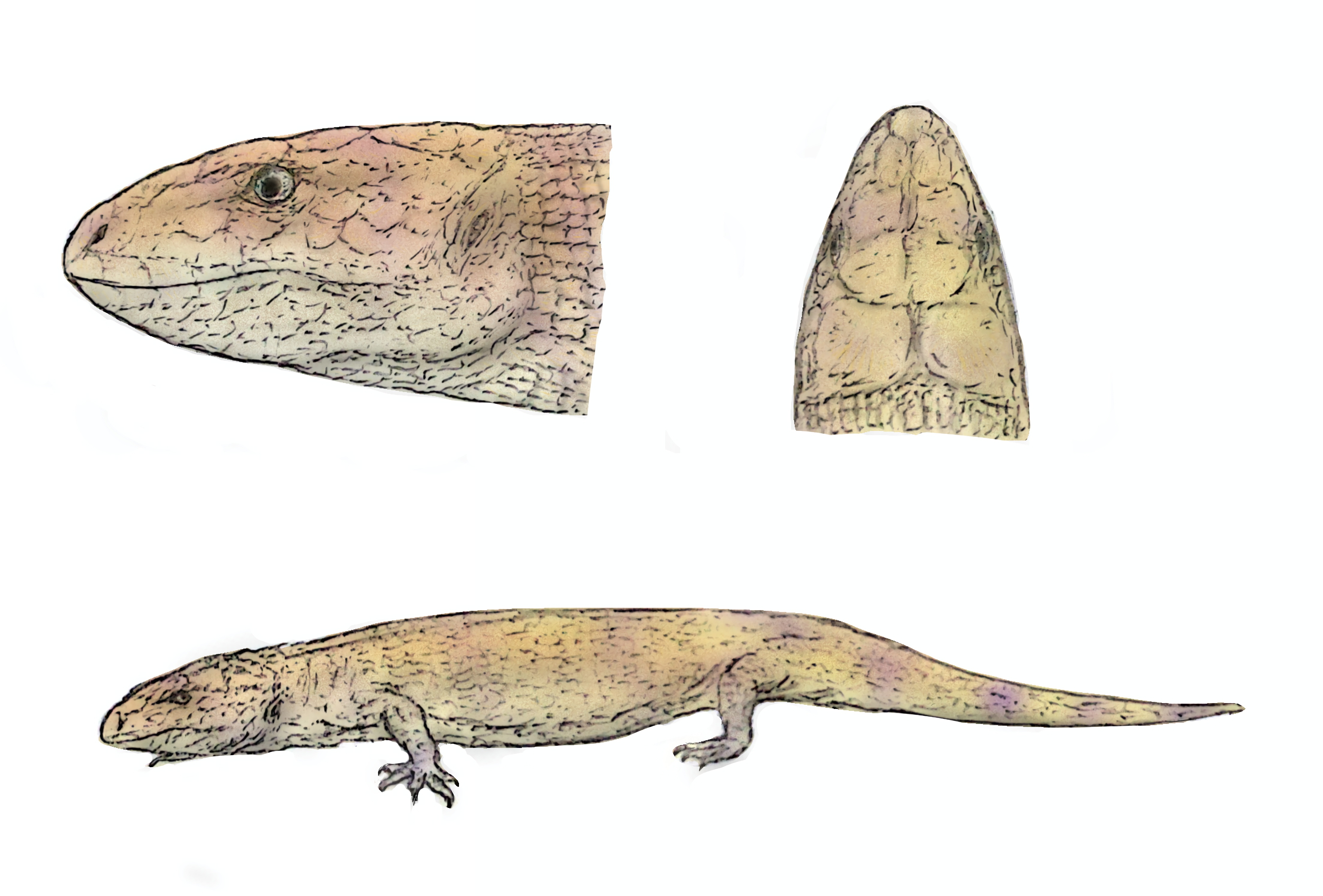
Life appearance reconstruction
