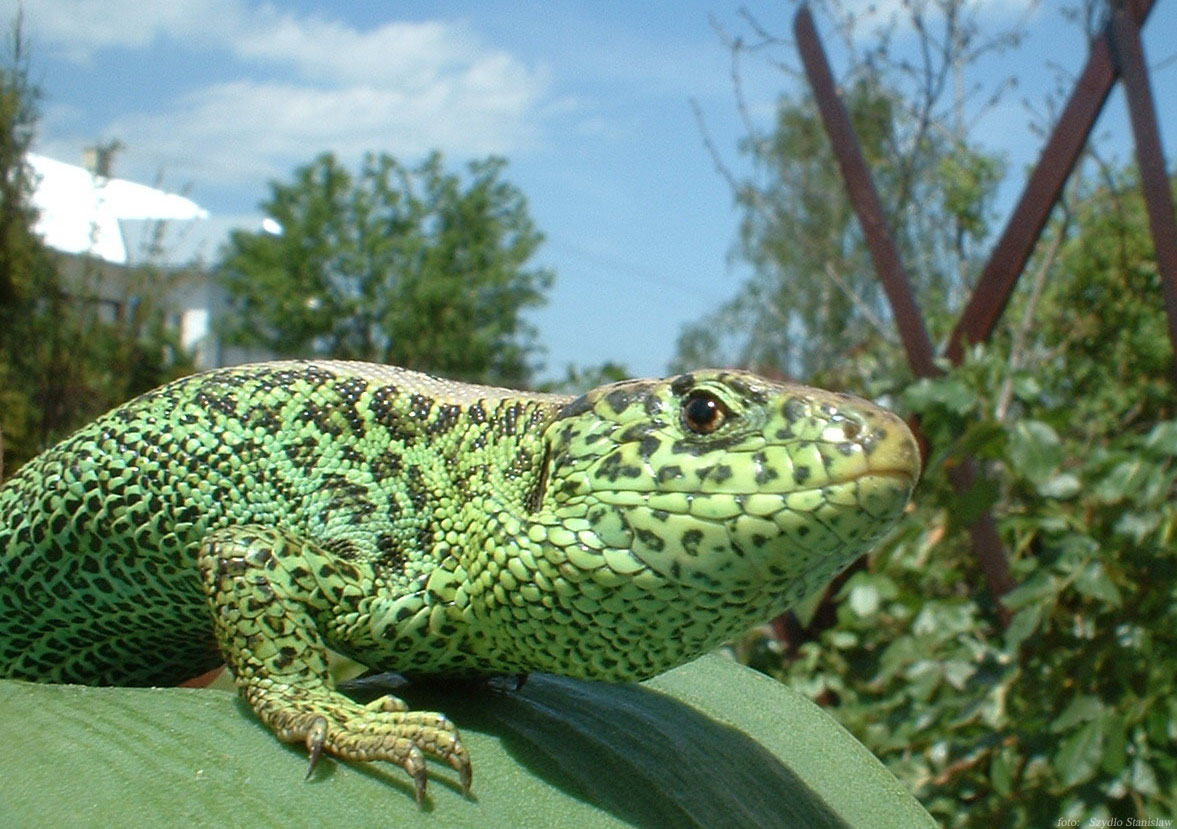
- A sand lizard, Lacerta agilis

Scientific classification
- Kingdom: Animalia
- Phylum: Chordata
- Class: Reptilia
- Order: Squamata
- Clade: Lacertoidea; Oppel, 1811

Subgroups
- †Purbicella?; †Cryptolacerta; †Slavoia; †Eolacertidae; †Barbatteiidae; †Polyglyphanodontia?; Lacertibaenia; Amphisbaenia; Lacertidae; Gymnophthalmoidea; Alopoglossidae; Gymnophthalmidae; Teiidae

= Lacertoidea =

Lacertoids Temporal range: Campanian–Holocene, 84–0 Ma

Group of lizards

The Lacertoidea is a group of squamate reptiles that includes the Lacertidae, Teiidae, Gymnophthalmidae, and Amphisbaenia. The finding from molecular phylogenetic studies that the burrowing Amphisbaenia were nested in a clade with the lizard forms led Vidal & Hedges (2005) to propose a new name for the group based on shared morphogical characters, Laterata, "referring to the presence of tile-like (squarish or quadrangular, and sometimes raised) scales that form the rings in Amphisbaenia, and are also present ventrally in Lacertiformata and Teiformata".

Studies of anatomy have traditionally grouped the lacertoids with skinks; however, more recent studies focusing on DNA have placed them as a distinct group of lizards, more closely related to the venomous Toxicofera. The relationships of the Amphisbaenia to other lizards have long been a mystery; although superficially snakelike, their anatomy and locomotion is quite distinct from that of snakes, and Amphisbaenia have a reduced right lung while snakes have their left lung reduced. However, they do not closely resemble any other group of lizards. Recent molecular studies suggest that amphisbaenians are grouped with the Lacertidae, in a group named the Lacertibaenia.

Lacertoids have a wide geographic distribution. The Lacertidae are found throughout Europe and Asia, with a major radiation endemic to Africa. The Teiidae are diverse in South America, but some members of the group occur in southern North America as well. The Amphisbaenia are especially widespread, occurring in North America, Europe, Africa, South America, and the Caribbean. The origins of the group are unclear. The oldest definitive lacertoid is the amphisbaenian Plesiorhineura, from the early Paleocene of North America. Given that it resembles modern worm lizards, the lacertoids most likely appeared and diversified in the Cretaceous. However, Berriasian taxon Purbicella may be a lacertoid, and would be the oldest known.

Within the Laterata there are many species listed on IUCN Redlist conservation status. This family listed 5 species extinct, 31 species critically endangered, 53 species endangered, 40 species vulnerable, 53 species near threatened, and 569 species as least concerned.
