= Teiformata =

Scientific classification
- Kingdom: Animalia
- Phylum: Chordata
- Class: Reptilia
- Order: Squamata
- Clade: Lacertoidea
- Clade: Teiformata; Vidal & Hedges, 2005

Families
- Gymnophthalmidae; Teiidae

Teiformata is a clade of squamate reptiles within Lacertoidea that comprises the New World lizard families Gymnophthalmidae and Teiidae. The name was introduced in a molecular phylogenetic classification of squamates by Vidal and Hedges (2005).

== Taxonomy and systematics ==
Vidal and Hedges (2005) placed Teiformata within their higher-level grouping Laterata, alongside Lacertiformata and Amphisbaenia. In that scheme, Lacertiformata and Amphisbaenia were recovered together as Lacertibaenia, distinct from Teiformata within Laterata.

== Phylogeny ==
Large-scale molecular phylogenies have supported a lacertoidean clade containing Gymnophthalmidae and Teiidae. Within the same lacertoidean context, a separate clade uniting Lacertidae and Amphisbaenia has also been recovered, highlighting a major split among sampled lacertoidean lineages in these analyses.

== Distribution ==
Because both constituent families are New World groups, Teiformata is primarily an American clade in terms of the present-day distribution of its living members.
