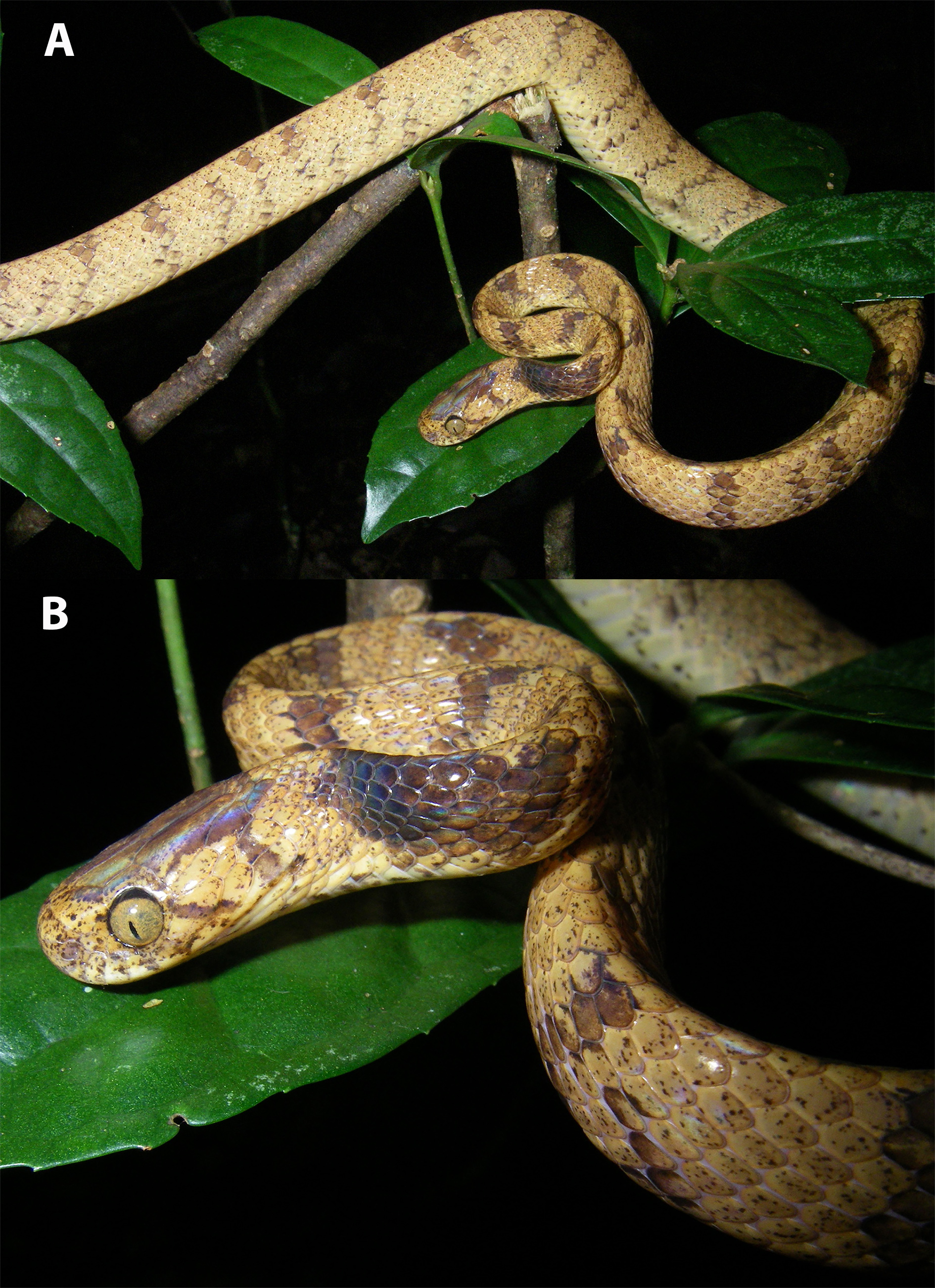

Scientific classification
- Kingdom: Animalia
- Phylum: Chordata
- Class: Reptilia
- Order: Squamata
- Suborder: Serpentes
- Family: Pareidae
- Genus: Pareas
- Species: P. capitulatus

Binomial name
- Pareas capitulatus Stuart, Seateun, Sivongxay, Souvannavong, Phimmachak, 2025

= Pareas capitulatus =

Species of snake

Pareas capitulatus, also known as the narrow-headed snail-eating snake, is a non-venomous snake endemic to Laos.

== Description ==
=== Colouration ===
Pareas capitulatus is dorsally yellow-brown with dark brown speckling. About 40 irregular dark brown transverse stripes can be found on each side of the body, sometimes intersecting or merged. These stripes are darker and thicker on the anterior portion of the body, narrowing and fading closer to the posterior before becoming irregular spotting on the tail. Ventrally, Pareas capitulatus is light yellow with scattered dark brown speckling. Its iris is yellow-green with a black pupil.

The top of its head is mostly dark brown, accompanied below by a large dark brown nuchal blotch completely separated from the splotch on top of the head by a complete light occiput band. Two dark brown ocular stripes are present on either side of the head; one that runs from the posterior margin of the prefrontal scale through the ocular scales to the mouth, and a second running from the dark marking on the top of the head through the posterior temporal scales to the mouth.

=== Structure ===
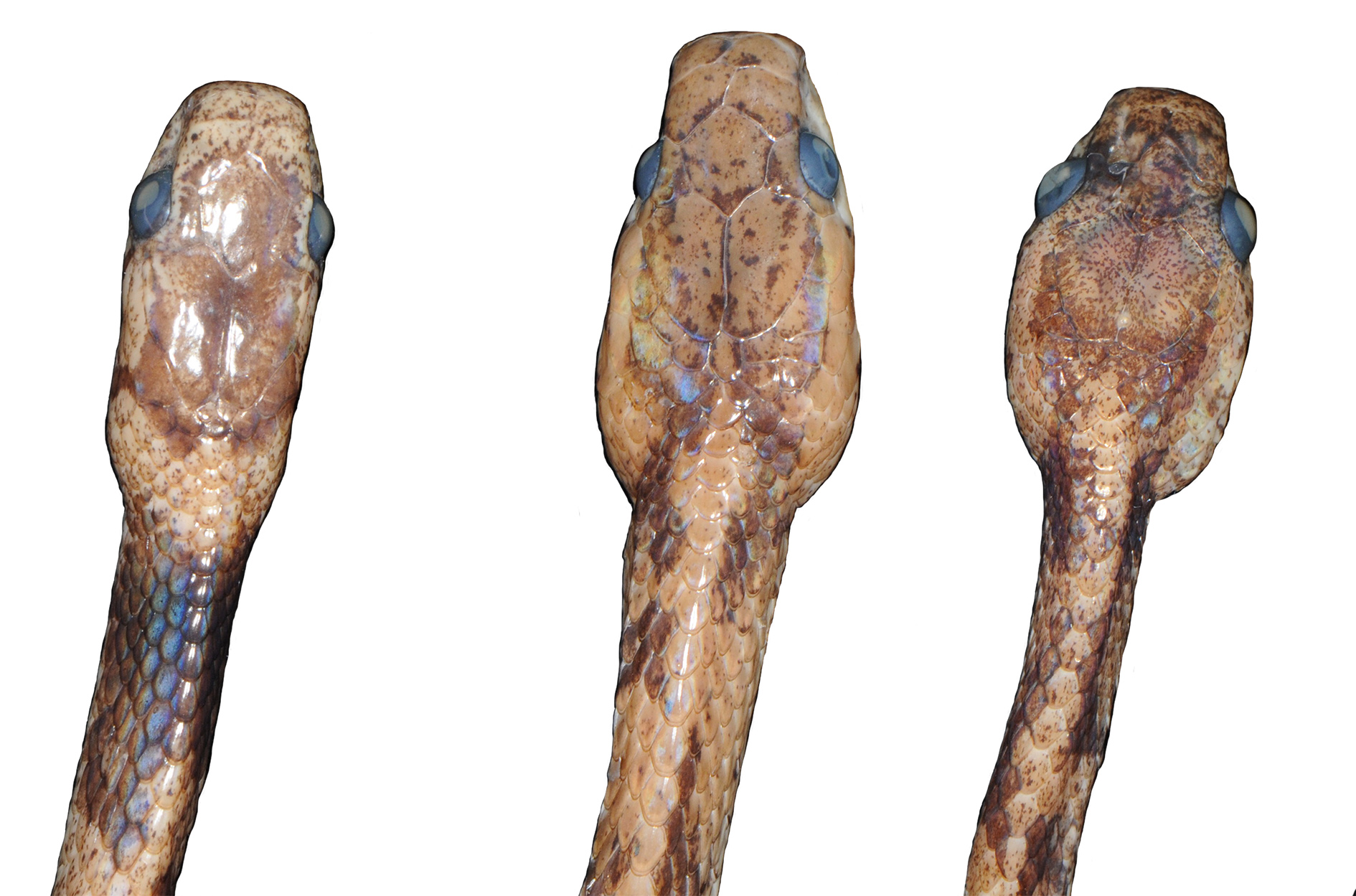
Dorsal view of heads (left to right) of holotype female of Pareas capitulatus, a Pareas yunnanensis specimen, and a Pareas formosensis specimen in preservative.

As its common name suggests, Pareas capitulatus is most easily distinguished from others in Pareas by a comparatively narrow head; so narrow that its eyes project beyond the parallel lateral margins of the head from the dorsal view.

Other identifying features include an absence of keeled scales, its distinctly shield-shaped frontal scale, a single slightly enlarged row of vertebral scales, its possession of 7 supralabial scales, 6 infralabial scales, 175 ventral scales, and 75 subcaudal scales.

== Behaviour ==
Like its congeners, Pareas capitulatus is a nocturnal, semi-arboreal, oviparous snail and slug specialist.

== Distribution ==
Pareas capitulatus is known only from its holotype, which was found at night on a shrub one metre above ground in a wet evergreen forest 1475 metres above sea level on the Dakchung Plateau in the Dakchung District of Laos.

== Taxonomy ==
Pareas capitulatus is most closely related to other members of the Pareas hamptoni species group, including P. formosensis, P. guanyinshanensis, P. hamptoni, P. niger, P. geminatus, P. xuelinensis, and P. yunnanensis.

== Etymology ==
The specific epithet capitulatus is a Latin adjective for “having a small head,” in reference to the species' distinctly narrow head.
