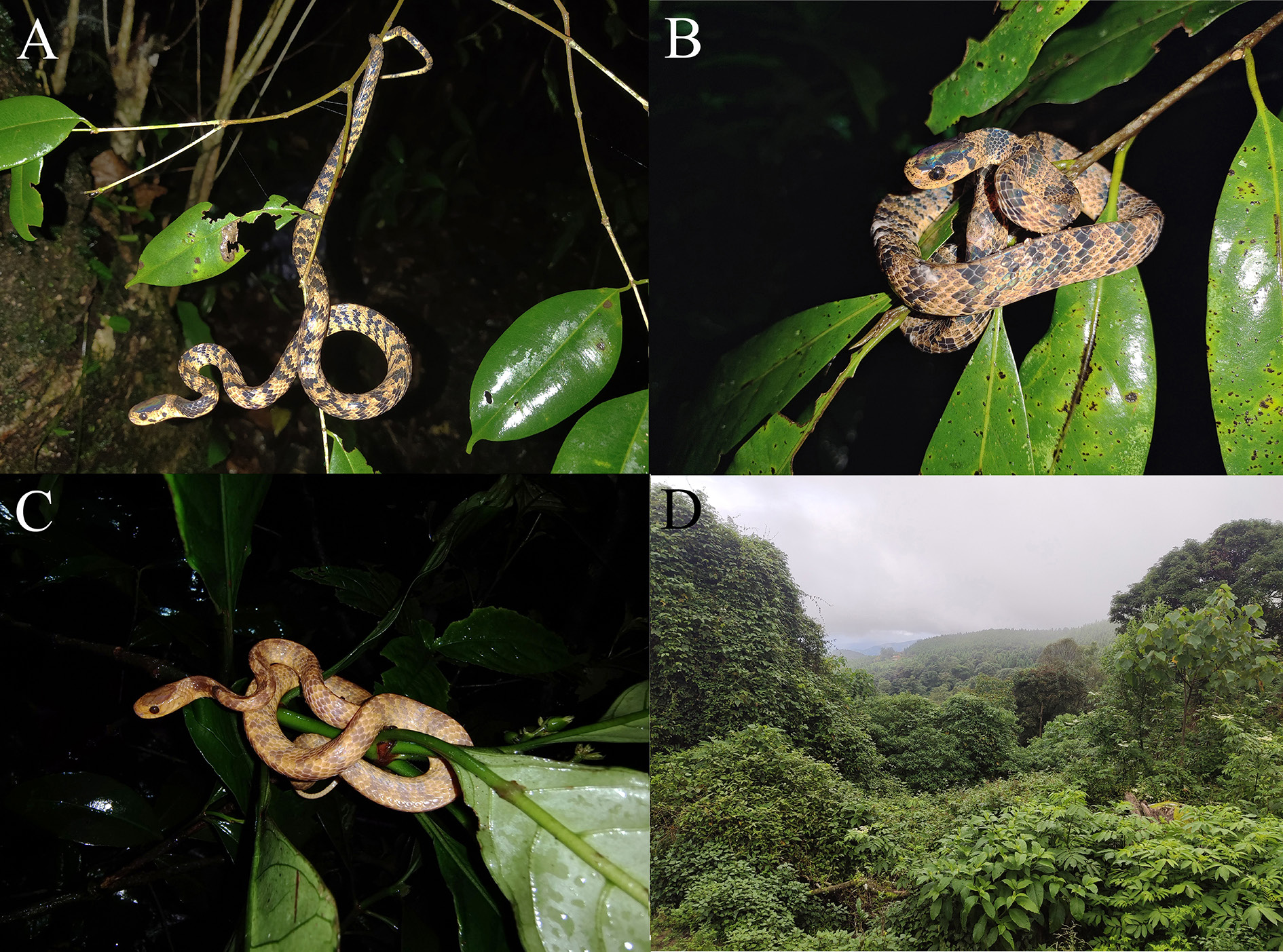

Scientific classification
- Kingdom: Animalia
- Phylum: Chordata
- Class: Reptilia
- Order: Squamata
- Suborder: Serpentes
- Family: Pareidae
- Genus: Pareas
- Species: P. tigerinus

Binomial name
- Pareas tigerinus Liu, Zhang, Poyarkov, Hou, Wu, Rao, Nguyen, & Vogel, 2023

= Pareas tigerinus =

Species of snake

Pareas tigerinus, also known as the tiger slug-eating snake, is a non-venomous snake endemic to China.

== Description ==
=== Colouration ===
The dorsal surface of the head is solid black or red-brown, while a large black band- disconnected from the black blotch on top of the head- is present on the nape of the neck. The sides of the head are yellow with two to three black spots on either side at the lower rear part of the eye and the angle of the mouth. The irises are black-brown or red-brown.

The dorsal surface of P. tigerinus is largely light brown to yellow-orange with about 80 dark, distinct vertical bars on the trunk and tail. The ventral surfaces of the body are light yellow with some scattered black speckling.

=== Scalation ===
Pareas tigerinus has a single preocular scale, with the post- and sub-ocular scales fused. The loreal scales do not border the ocular scales, while the prefrontal scales do. P. tigerinus has eight infralabials and seven supralabials. All eight infralabial scales are not fused with chin shields, of which there are three pairs; the first being triangular, the remaining being elongate.

There are 15 rows of dorsal scales over the entire body, with enlarged vertebral scales. None of the scales on the anterior portion of the body are keeled, though keeling is present on 3 to 5 rows of mid-dorsal scales at mid-body in females. 5 to 9 rows of mid-dorsal scales are keeled on the posterior portion of the body. The pre-cloacal plate is undivided.

Images of P. tigerinus

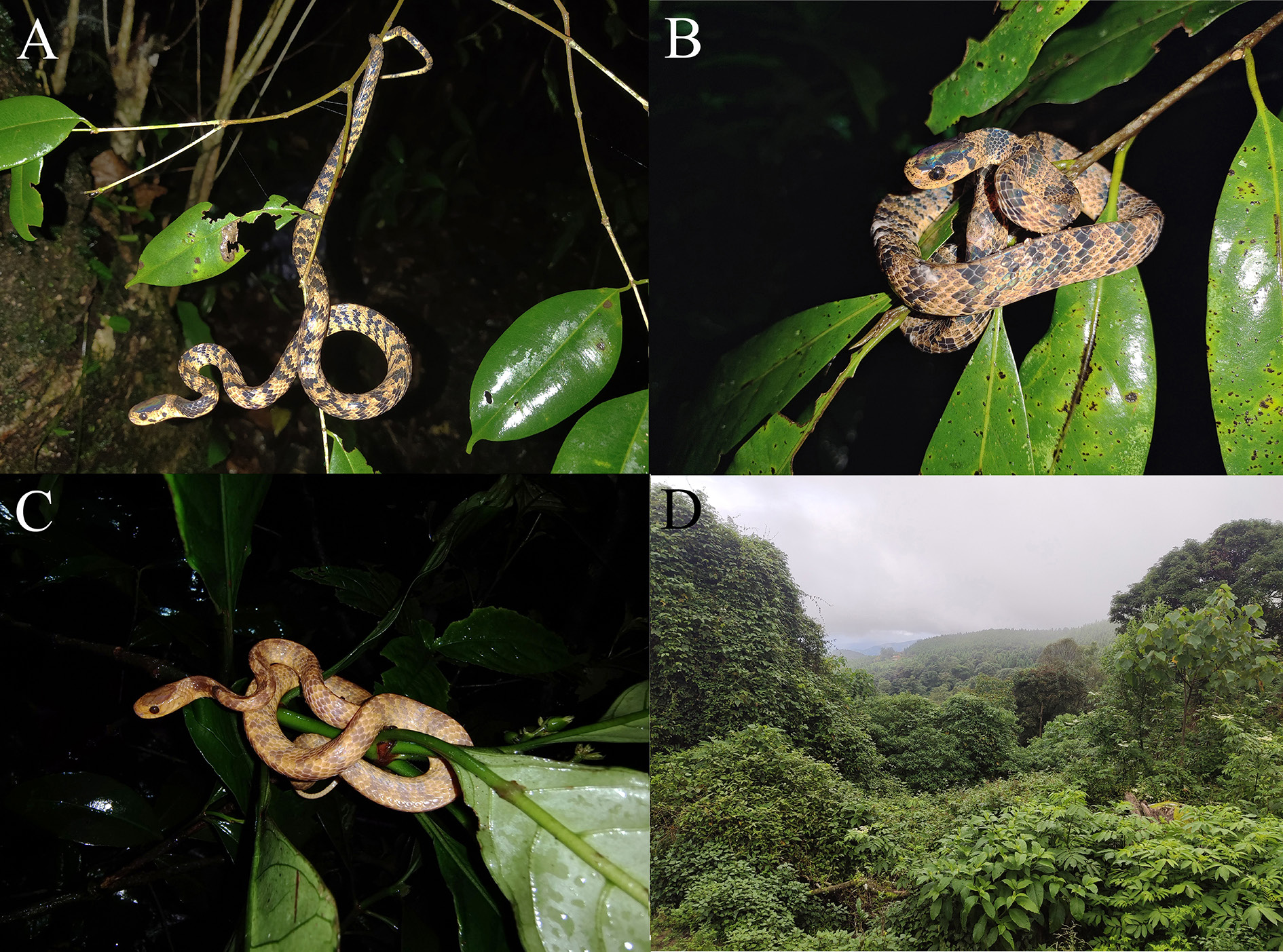
Pareas tigerinus in situ.

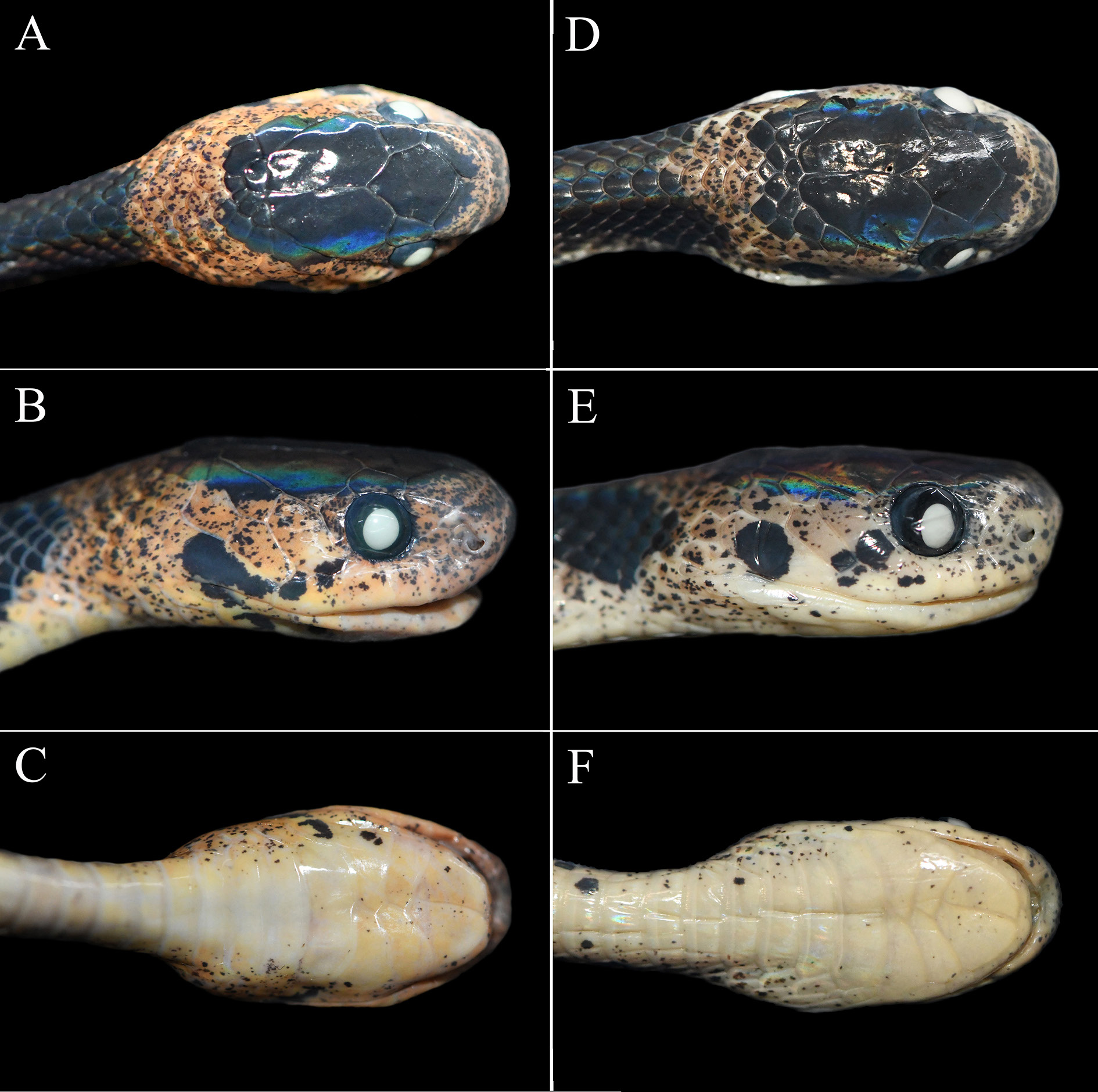
The head of the holotype and one paratype of P. tigerinus; dorsal view, lateral view, and ventral view.

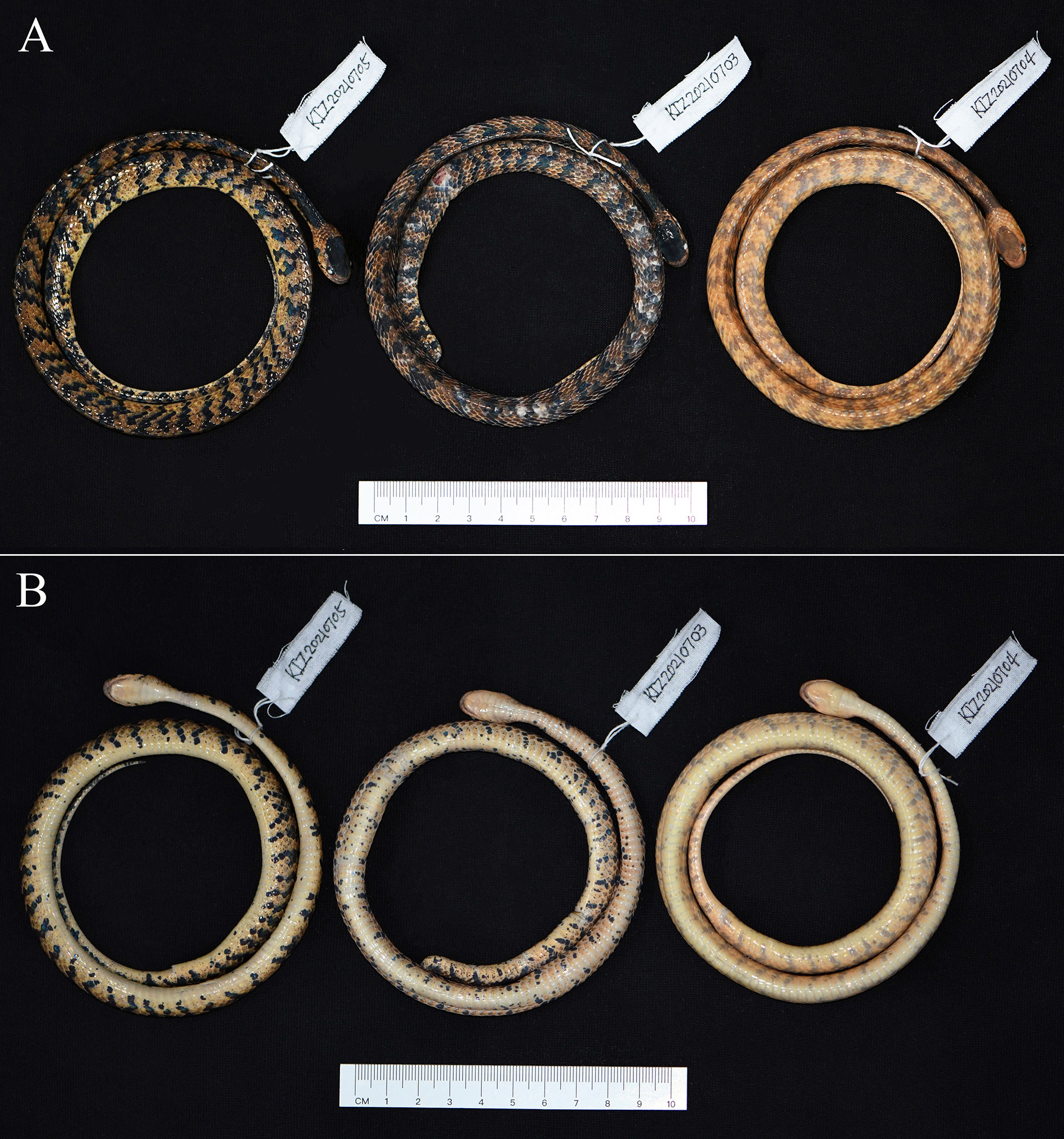
The holotype and two paratypes of P. tigerinus.

== Behaviour ==
Like its congeners, P. tigerinus is a nocturnal, semi-arboreal, oviparous snail and slug specialist. The specimens were found perching on bushes along a small stream in a forest at night. It was observed alongside Diploderma menghaiense, Pareas xuielinensis, and Raorchestes hillisi.

== Distribution ==
Pareas tigerinus is currently known only from its type locality in Menghai County, China, with an elevation of 1920 metres. It is suspected to occur in Myanmar and northwestern Laos, but this remains to be seen.

== Taxonomy ==
Pareas tigerinus belongs to the subgenus Eberhardtia within the P. hamptoni species group.

== Etymology ==
The specific name tigerinus refers to the similarity of its colour pattern to the lateral stripes in tigers.
