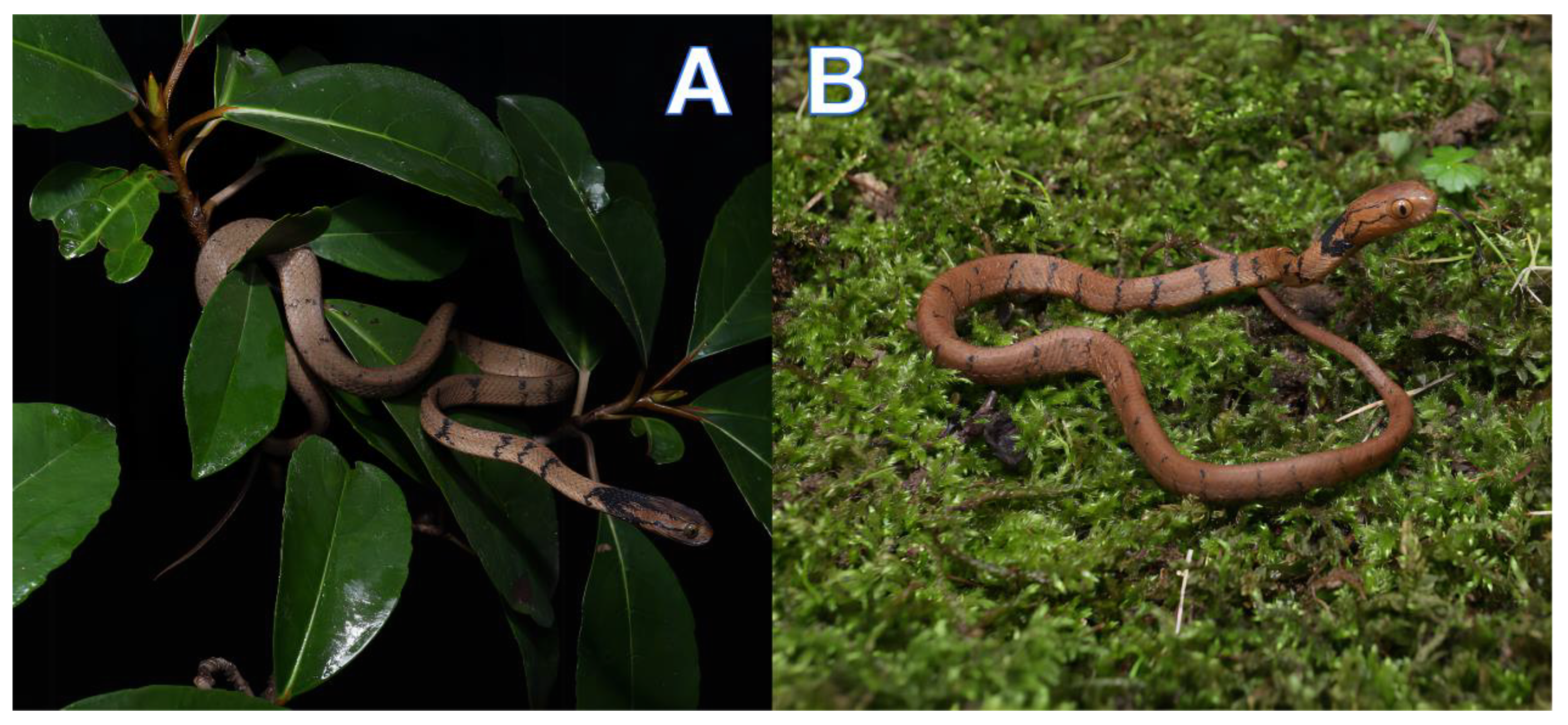

Scientific classification
- Kingdom: Animalia
- Phylum: Chordata
- Class: Reptilia
- Order: Squamata
- Suborder: Serpentes
- Family: Pareidae
- Genus: Pareas
- Species: P. baiseensis

Binomial name
- Pareas baiseensis Wu, Gong, Huang, & Xu, 2023

= Pareas baiseensis =

Species of snake

Pareas baiseensis, also known as the Baise slug-eating snake, is a non-venomous snake endemic to the Guangxi Zhuang Autonomous Region of China.

== Description ==
=== Colouration ===
The dorsal surfaces of the head are light brown with dark brown spots. The sides of the head have two lateral postocular stripes. The upper postocular stripe extending from the temporal scales backward to the nape while the lower postocular stripe extends backwards past the ninth supralabial scale, also contacting the nape.

Two black lines on the back of the parietal scales extend back to the neck alongside the two postorbital stripes to form a dark black four-pointed fork-shaped nuchal collar where the inner two tines of the fork are shorter than the outer two.

The dorsum of the body is brown with dark-brown speckling, and about 35 irregular black crossbands spanning from neck to vent on the sides. The ventral scales are yellowish cream with scattered black spots- though the ventral color darkens toward the posterior- flanked by light brown subcaudal scales.

=== Scalation and size ===
All four specimens of Pareas baiseensis have 1 postocular scale, 2 preocular scales, 1 loreal scale, 9 infralabial scales and 8 supralabial scales on either side of their heads, though the number of subocular (3/3 for the adult, 2/2 for the juveniles), posterior temporal (3/3 in the adult, +/-1 on either side in juveniles), and anterior temporal scales (2/2 in juveniles, +1 on the right side in the adult) vary between the adult male holotype and the three juvenile unsexed paratypes.

About 190 ventral scales and 95 subcaudal scales are to be expected alongside an undivided cloacal plate. 15 dorsal scale rows can be found across the entire body, with one vertebral scale row enlarged and five medial dorsal scale rows keeled. The total length of the adult holotype is 579mm.

== Behaviour ==
Like its congeners, Pareas baiseensis is a nocturnal, semi-arboreal, oviparous snail and slug-eating specialist.

== Distribution ==
Pareas baiseensis is known only from its type locality in the Daleng Township of Youjiang District, near Baise City in China. The type series this species is known from were found late at night in a well-preserved subtropical broad-leafed evergreen forest at 750 to 790 metres above sea level after light rain at the very beginning of the autumn dry season.

== Etymology ==
The specific epithet baiseensis refers to Baise City, which is near the locality of this species.
