= Pareas temporalis =

Scientific classification
- Kingdom: Animalia
- Phylum: Chordata
- Class: Reptilia
- Order: Squamata
- Suborder: Serpentes
- Family: Pareidae
- Genus: Pareas
- Species: P. temporalis

Binomial name
- Pareas temporalis Le, Tran, Hoang, & Stuart, 2021

Species of snake

Pareas temporalis, also known as the Di Linh slug-eating snake, is a non-venomous snake endemic to southern Vietnam.

== Description ==
Pareas temporalis has a yellow-brown to orange dorsum with dark brown speckling and a solid dark brown dorsal stripe extending from behind their nuchal collar along the entire length of the body and tail, edged by two light yellowish paravertebral lines. The top of the head is light brown while the supralabial scales are yellow-white, both with occasional small, brown spots.

The ventral surfaces of the head, body, and tail are all yellowish-cream with sparse brownish dusting and irregular spots. The iris is amber to bright orange with a black pupil.

Two stripes begin at the postocular scales; the upper stripes extend from the upper corner of the eyes to the temporal area before dividing into two long stripes that meet in an 'X' shape at the nape, while the lower postocular stripes, frequently interrupted, extend to the corner of the jaw posteriorly over the lower temporal scales to the eighth and seventh supralabial scales- but not the chin or lower jaw- before converging to join the black nuchal collar.

== Behaviour ==
Like its congeners, P. temporalis is a nocturnal, semi-arboreal, oviparous snail and slug specialist.

== Distribution ==
Pareas temporalis is endemic to the Langbian Plateau of southern Vietnam.

== Etymology ==
The specific Latin epithet temporalis refers to its high number of temporal scales.
