= Pareas abros =

Scientific classification
- Kingdom: Animalia
- Phylum: Chordata
- Class: Reptilia
- Order: Squamata
- Suborder: Serpentes
- Family: Pareidae
- Genus: Pareas
- Species: P. abros

Binomial name
- Pareas abros Poyarkov, Nguyen, Vogel & Orlov, 2022

Species of snake

Pareas abros, the cute slug-eating snake, is a non-venomous species of slug-eating snake native to Vietnam described in January 2022.

== Description ==
Pareas abros is mostly yellowish-brown with a distinct dark brown dorsal line and nearly indistinct black-brown dorsal speckling. 44 to 56 faint, interrupted, transverse dark-brown bands occur across the entirety of the snake's body. Its belly is beige with dense brownish-gray dusting and dark brown elongate spots which form two longitudinal lines on the lateral sides of the ventral scales. 9 to 11 rows of dorsal scales are keeled at mid-body.

Thick slate-black stripes begin at the upper postocular scales, separating into two after the secondary temporal scales to form a thick black line that continues beyond the neck. Upper postocular stripes connect past the seventh supralabial scale to form a ring-shaped blotch on the nape of its neck while two thick, black lower postocular stripes reach the sixth and eighth supralabial scales before continuing to the lower jaw.

== Behaviour ==
Like the others of its genus, P. abros is likely a nocturnal, oviparous, semi-arboreal snail and slug-eater.

== Distribution ==
Three paratypes were collected from the montane evergreen tropical forest of the Sao La Nature Reserve in Thua Thien-Hue province at roughly 796 metres above sea level.

The holotype was collected in montane evergreen tropical forest near the tributaries of the Paete River in the Song Thanh National Park, Quang Nam province, 1083 metres above sea level.

In both localities, the snakes were recorded in fragments of primary polydominant forest along the banks of montane streams, 1 to 1.5 metres above the ground in the branches of bushes and trees.

== Etymology ==
The species name "abros" is a Latinized adjective in nominative singular derived from the classical Greek word "abros" (αβρός), meaning "cute", "handsome", and "delicate".
