= Pareas nuchalis =

Conservation status
- Least Concern (IUCN 3.1)

Scientific classification
- Kingdom: Animalia
- Phylum: Chordata
- Class: Reptilia
- Order: Squamata
- Suborder: Serpentes
- Family: Pareidae
- Genus: Pareas
- Species: P. nuchalis

Binomial name
- Pareas nuchalis (Boulenger, 1900)

Species of snake

Pareas nuchalis, also known as the barred slug-eating snake, is a non-venomous snake native to Indonesia and Malaysia.

== Description ==
Pareas nuchalis is mostly tan to light brown with weak dark brown vertebral spots and 61 to 78 transverse dark brown bands. Stripes beginning at the upper postocular scales contact one another at the nape of the neck, forming a large, black, ring-shaped blotch. The stripes beginning at the lower postocular scales are thick and black, reaching the anterior portion of the sixth supralabial scale and frequently continuing to the lower jaw and chin.

The belly is yellowish, sometimes with sparse brown dusting. The iris is whitish with brownish speckles and veins that become denser nearest the pupil.

== Behaviour ==
Like its congeners, P. nuchalis is a nocturnal, oviparous, semi-arboreal snail and slug specialist.

== Distribution ==
Until recently, it was considered endemic to Borneo, though it was recently recorded in central Sumatra, where it was previously confused for P. carinatus.

== Etymology ==
The species name "nuchalis" is a Latin adjective in nominative singular meaning “nuchal” and was given in reference to the characteristic black ring-shaped spot on the nape.
