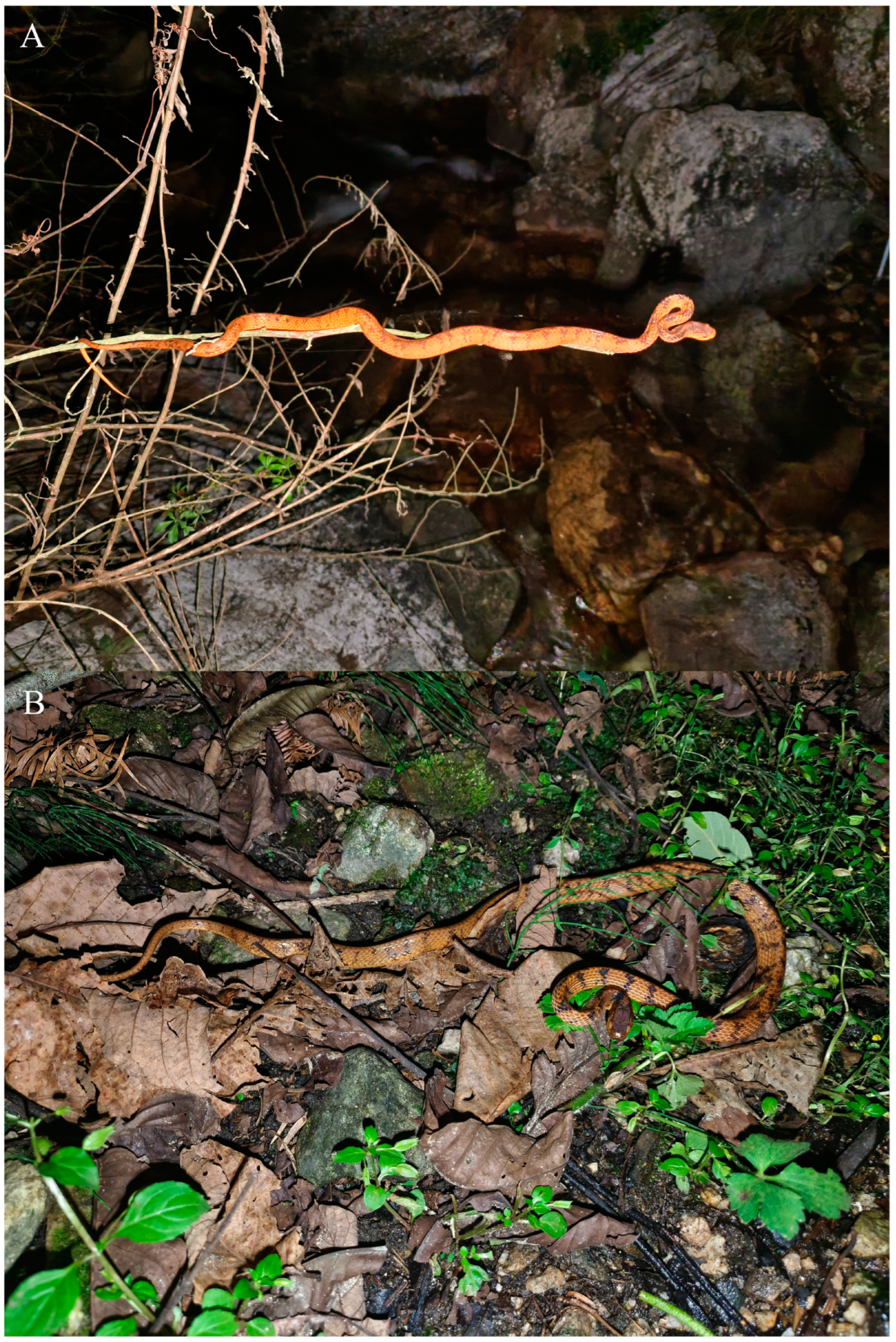

Scientific classification
- Kingdom: Animalia
- Phylum: Chordata
- Class: Reptilia
- Order: Squamata
- Suborder: Serpentes
- Family: Pareidae
- Genus: Pareas
- Species: P. guanyinshanensis

Binomial name
- Pareas guanyinshanensis Liu, Mo, Li, Li, Luo, Rao, & Li, 2024

= Pareas guanyinshanensis =

Species of snake

Pareas guanyinshanensis, also known as the Guanyinshan slug-eating snake, is a non-venomous snake endemic to Yunnan, China.

== Description ==
=== Colouration ===
Dorsal surface of the head is a dark yellow-red to yellow-brown with dense mottling, while that of the body is a light yellow-red to yellow-brown with about 50 vertical black stripes on either side that occasionally connect with each other on the vertebral scales. Two thick black stripes span from the nape to the occipital scales, while another stripe spans from the lower postocular scales to the junction of the last 2 supralabial scales on each side of the head. The ventral surfaces of the snake are pinkish-yellow to light yellow with scattered black spots. The iris is reddish-yellow to yellow with a black pupil.

=== Scalation and size ===
The prefrontal scales border the ocular scales while the loreal scales do not. One preocular scale and one postocular scale (which may or may not be fused with the subocular scale on either side) are present. P. guanyinshanensis possesses 7 to 8 supralabials; 6 to 8 infralabials (none of which are fused with the chin shields); and 3 pairs of chin shields. 15 rows of dorsal scales are present throughout the body with one row enlarged. Five rows of mid-dorsal scales are keeled at mid-body and 5 to 7 rows of mid-dorsal scales are keeled at the posterior portion of the body. No keeled scales are present on the anterior portion of the body.

Adults reach an average of 64.5cm (25.4in) in length.

== Behaviour ==
Like its congeners, Pareas guanyinshanensis is a nocturnal, semi-arboreal, oviparous snail and slug specialist.

== Distribution ==
Pareas guanyinshanensis is known only from Guanyinshan Provincial Nature Preserve in Yunnan, China.

== Etymology ==
The specific epithet guanyinshanensis refers to Guanyinshan Provincial Nature Reserve, where the only specimens were found.
