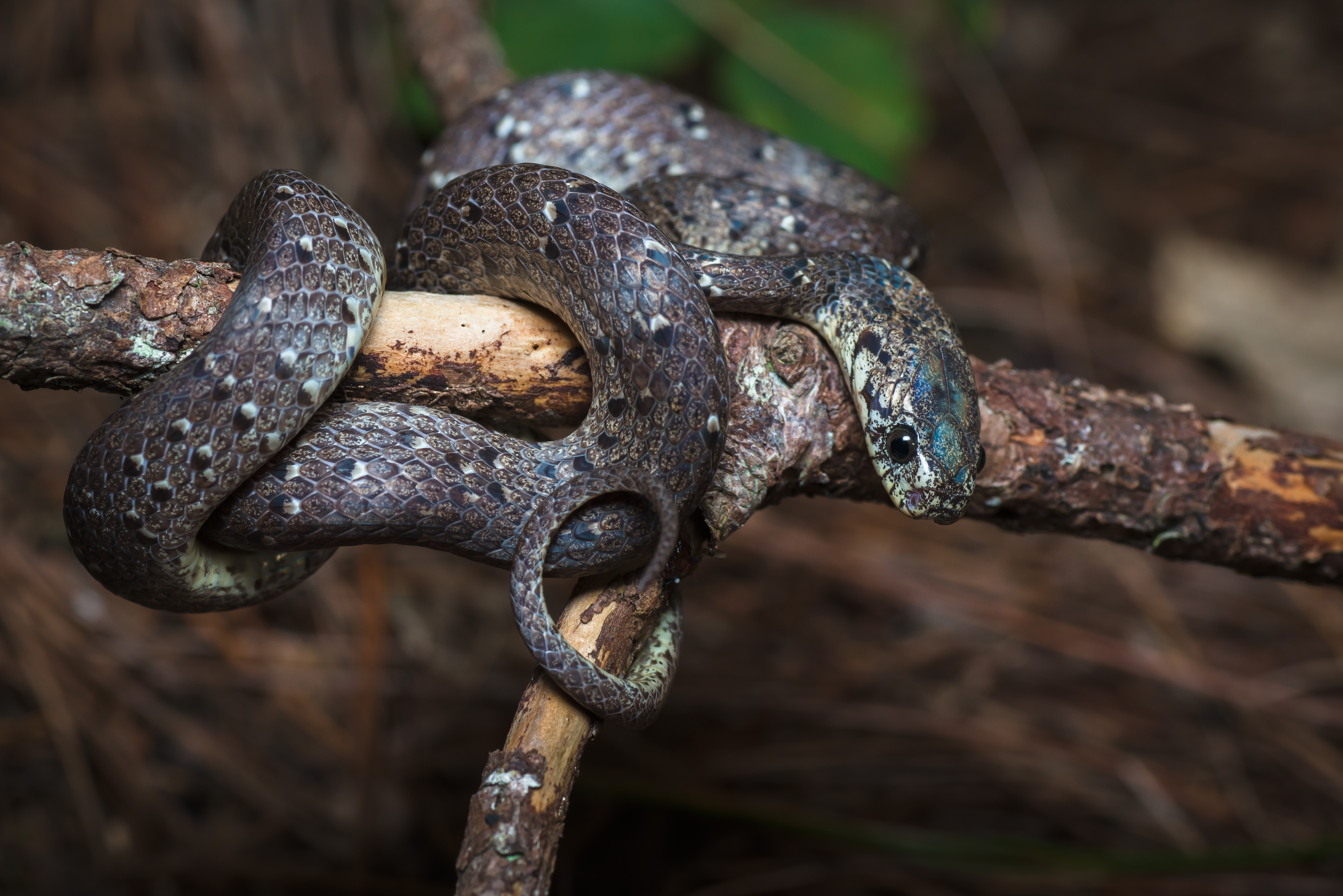

Scientific classification
- Kingdom: Animalia
- Phylum: Chordata
- Class: Reptilia
- Order: Squamata
- Suborder: Serpentes
- Family: Pareidae
- Genus: Pareas
- Species: P. macularius

Binomial name
- Pareas macularius Theobald, 1868

= Pareas macularius =

Species of snake

Pareas macularius, the mountain slug snake, is a species of snake found in southeast Asia and surrounding countries.

== Description ==
=== Colouration ===
Ochre brown to red-brown with somewhat reticulated (having a grid- or network-like pattern) bars formed by particoloured scales—white in front and deep claret brown behind—that give the snake a half-banded, half-spotted appearance. A white nuchal collar mottled with claret-red is usually present. Brown spotted and mottled belly.

=== Scalation ===
Fifteen rows of smooth dorsal scales are present across the entire body, though they may be weakly keeled posteriorly. Possesses 6 or 7 supralabial scales, anteriorly high and narrow; 5 to 7 subocular scales, not contacting the labial scales; One loreal scale; Subequal frontal scales; 8 sublabial scales; & 3 pairs of chin shields.

== Behaviour ==
Like its congeners, Pareas macularius is a nocturnal, semi-arboreal, oviparous snail and slug specialist.

== Distribution ==
Pareas macularius can be found across much of southeastern Asia, including India, Bangladesh, Myanmar, Thailand, Laos, Vietnam, Malaysia and southern China.

== Etymology ==
The specific name macularius derives from the Latin word macula meaning "spot" or "blemish", referring to the snake's particolour spotted markings.
