= Pareas kuznetsovorum =

Scientific classification
- Kingdom: Animalia
- Phylum: Chordata
- Class: Reptilia
- Order: Squamata
- Suborder: Serpentes
- Family: Pareidae
- Genus: Pareas
- Species: P. kuznetsovorum

Binomial name
- Pareas kuznetsovorum Poyarkov et al. 2022

Species of snake

Pareas kuznetsovorum, also known as Kuznetsov's slug-eating snake, is a non-venomous snake endemic to the northeastern foothills of the Langbian Plateau in Phu Yen, Vietnam.

== Description ==
The dorsum of P. kuznetsovorum is tan to light brown with a distinct dark brown vertebral line, blackish vertebral spots, and about 70 transverse dark brown bands. Two lateral stripes beginning at the upper postocular scales are thick black and merge at the nape of the neck to form a trident-shaped chevron. The lower postocular stripes are thin and black, reaching the anterior part of the seventh supralabial scale but not the lower jaw or chin.

The top of the head has dense, darker marbling, while the underside and a portion of the lower half is off-white with dark brown spots and blotches; ventrally yellow-white with a few small black dots. Upper labial scales have dense brown dusting.

Its belly is yellow with sparse dark-gray dusting and elongate brown spots that form three longitudinal lines on the ventral scales. The iris of the eye is uniformly off-white with beige lateral parts and a black pupil.

== Behaviour ==
As in other congeners, P. kuznetsovorum is a nocturnal, oviparous, semi-arboreal slug and snail specialist.

== Distribution ==
Pareas kuznetsovorum is known only from the type locality in the north-eastern foothills of the Langbian Plateau in Vietnam, though it is suspected to inhabit the fragmented lowland and mid-elevation evergreen forests of the northwestern slopes of the plateau- particularly the adjacent parts of the Dak Lak and Khanh Hoa provinces of southern Vietnam.

== Etymology ==
The specific name "kuznetsovorum" is the plural possessive form of the family name Kuznetsov. The species is named after Andrei N. Kuznetsov and Svetlana P. Kuznetsova, two biologists who have financially contributed to the organization of biological expeditions of the Joint Russian-Vietnamese Tropical Center across Vietnam between 1996 and 2021, including the expedition that discovered the holotype.
