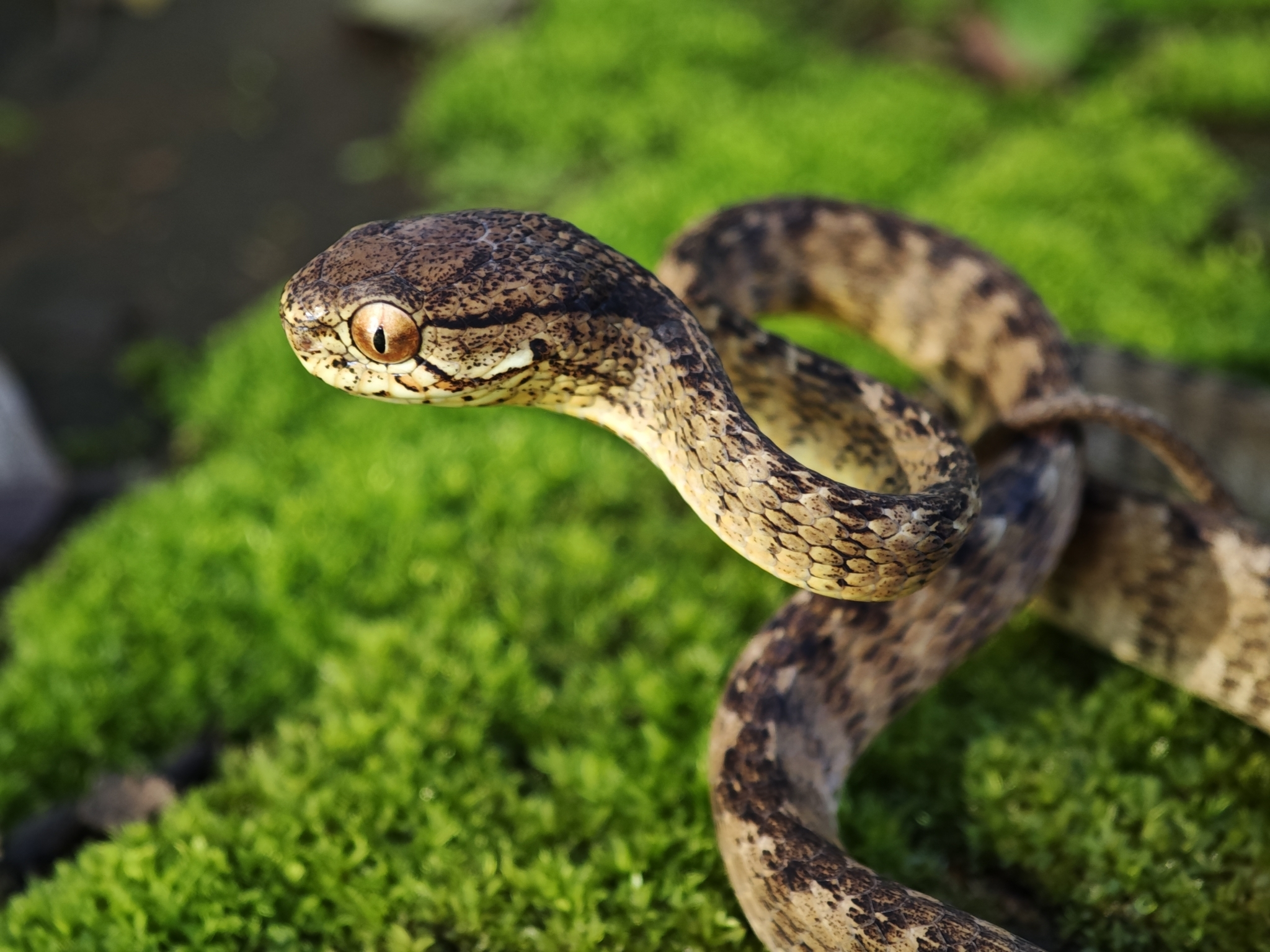

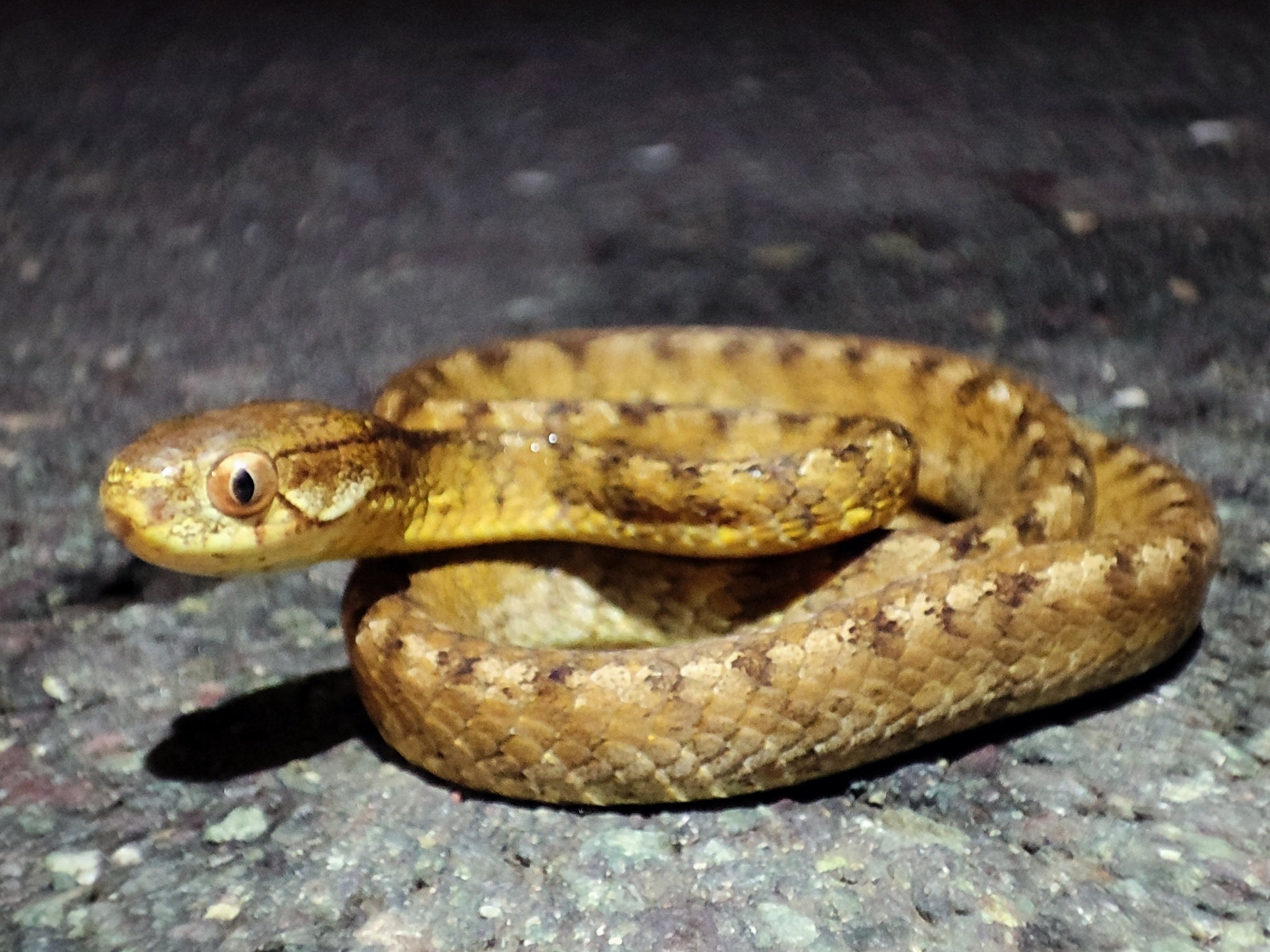

Scientific classification
- Domain: Eukaryota
- Kingdom: Animalia
- Phylum: Chordata
- Class: Reptilia
- Order: Squamata
- Suborder: Serpentes
- Family: Pareidae
- Genus: Pareas
- Species: P. berdmorei

Binomial name
- Pareas berdmorei Theobald, 1868

Subspecies
- Pareas berdmorei berdmorei Theobald, 1868; Pareas berdmorei unicolor (Bourret, 1934); Pareas berdmorei truongsonicus Poyarkov, Nguyen, Vogel, Brakels, & Pawangkhanant, 2022

Synonyms
- Pareas menglaensis Wang et al. 2020; Pareas berdmorei David & Deuti, 2022; Pareas menglaensis Wang et al. 2022; Pareas (Pareas) berdmorei Poyarkov et al. 2022; Pareas berdmorei truongsonicus Poyarkov et al. 2022; Pareas berdmorei unicolor (Bourret, 1934); Amblycephalus carinatus unicolor (Bourret, 1934); Pareas carinatus unicolor Nguyen et al. 2009; Pareas (Pareas) berdmorei unicolor Poyarkov et al. 2022

= Pareas berdmorei =

Species of snake

Pareas berdmorei, also known as the Mengla snail-eating snake or Berdmore's slug-eating snake, is a non-venomous snake native to Myanmar, China, Cambodia, Vietnam, Laos, and Thailand.

== Description ==
The dorsum of P. berdmorei is mostly yellow-brown to orange in color with variable dark markings. Thin stripes beginning at the upper postocular scales continue to the nape, often forming elongated dark markings. Its iris is uniform in color, which may vary from beige to bright red-orange. Its belly is white.

== Behaviour ==
Like the other snakes in its genus, P. berdmorei is an oviparous, semi-arboreal, nocturnal snail and slug eater.

== Distribution and subspecies ==
Pareas berdmorei is widely distributed across mainland Indochina north of the Kra Isthmus, with three major populations and three recognized subspecies.

Pareas berdmorei berdmorei inhabits northern Vietnam, northern Laos, northern Thailand, eastern Myanmar, and southern Yunnan, China.

Pareas berdmorei truongsonicus inhabits the northern Annanmites (Truong Son) Mountains in central Vietnam and Laos.

Pareas berdmorei unicolor inhabits southern Vietnam and adjacent eastern Cambodia.

== Etymology ==
Its specific name refers to the collector of its holotype, Captain Major Thomas Matthew Berdmore (1811–1859).
