= Pareas boulengeri =

Conservation status
- Least Concern (IUCN 3.1)

Scientific classification
- Kingdom: Animalia
- Phylum: Chordata
- Class: Reptilia
- Order: Squamata
- Suborder: Serpentes
- Family: Pareidae
- Genus: Pareas
- Species: P. boulengeri

Binomial name
- Pareas boulengeri (Angel, 1920)

Synonyms
- Amblycephalus stanleyi; Amblycephalus boulengeri; Amblycephalus monticola boulengeri

Species of snake

Pareas boulengeri, also known as Boulenger's slug snake, is a species of non-venomous snake native to southern China.

== Description ==
Pareas boulengeri has a very light brown upper body with minimal countershading. A narrow, dark brown, intermittently broken line runs from the posterior edge of the eye to the corner of the mouth. Two wider, frequently breaking dorsal lines run from the subocular scale, along the side of the parietal scales and to the head and neck where it loses definition, fading into irregular dots that may broaden across the sides and disappear toward the latter half of the body. These dots are tightly grouped on the cephalic scales. Juveniles' spots are much clearer.

Pareas boulengeri lay 5-7 eggs at a time, which likely need roughly 6.5 weeks to incubate before hatching, based on others of its genus.

== Behaviour ==
Pareas boulengeri is a nocturnal, mostly arboreal snake that feeds exclusively on snails and slugs. As such, they are known to forage agricultural lands late at night for roaming gastropods.

== Distribution ==
Pareas boulengeri is endemic to China, where it is widespread but rare due to its low population density, though there is very little fragmentation. Being mostly arboreal, P. boulengeri prefers montane forests 1,360 to 313 metres above sea level.

== Etymology ==
Its species is named after the Belgian-British zoologist George Albert Boulenger.
