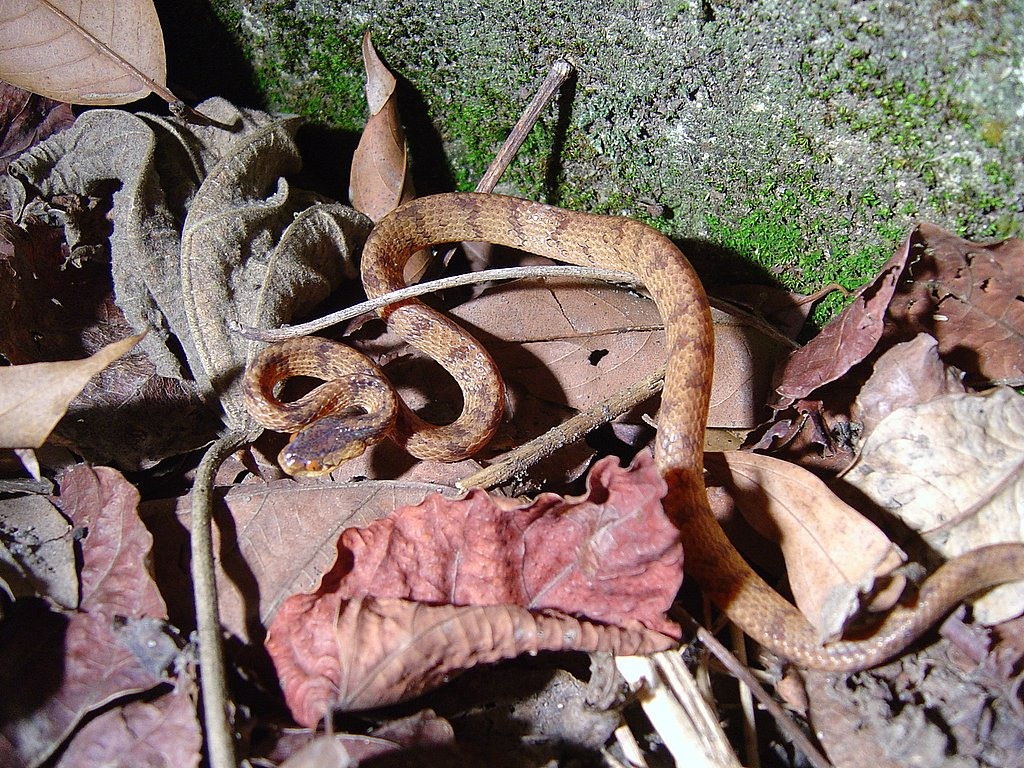

Conservation status
- Least Concern (IUCN 3.1)

Scientific classification
- Kingdom: Animalia
- Phylum: Chordata
- Class: Reptilia
- Order: Squamata
- Suborder: Serpentes
- Family: Pareidae
- Genus: Pareas
- Species: P. formosensis

Binomial name
- Pareas formosensis (Van Denburgh, 1909)

Synonyms
- Amblycephalus formosensis Van Denburgh, 1909; Psammodynastes compressus Ōshima, 1910; Pareas compressus (Ōshima, 1910)

= Formosa slug snake =

Species of snake

Formosa slug snake or Taiwan slug snake (Pareas formosensis) is a species of non-venomous snake in the family Pareatidae. It is endemic to Taiwan.

== Taxonomy ==
It has been suggested that Pareas chinensis should be treated as a synonym of P. formosensis, but recent genetic research does not support this: P. formosensis does not appear closely related to P. chinensis but is instead a sister species to P. hamptoni. The delineation of these species is not clear. In future, P. formosensis might become a subspecies of P. hamptoni, or some snakes from the mainland might be classified as P. formosensis.

Further studies have shown that Pareas komaii is a valid species, instead of being a synonym of P. formosensis. The study also described a new species, Pareas atayal, that have been confused with P. formosensis. Thus, three Pareas species occur in Taiwan.

== Description ==
The Formosa slug snake is a small snake with total length up to 70 cm (28 in). These snakes are widespread in mountainous, moist forests. Formosa slug snakes are nocturnal and feed on land snails and slugs. Female snakes produce a clutch of 2–9 eggs; the hatchlings measure about 15 cm (5.9 in) in total length.

P. formosensis is readily distinguished from P. komaii and P. atayal by its red iris and totally smooth dorsal scales.

== Distribution ==
The Formosa slug snake occurs throughout the mountain regions of Taiwan, except for the north-eastern tip of the island.
