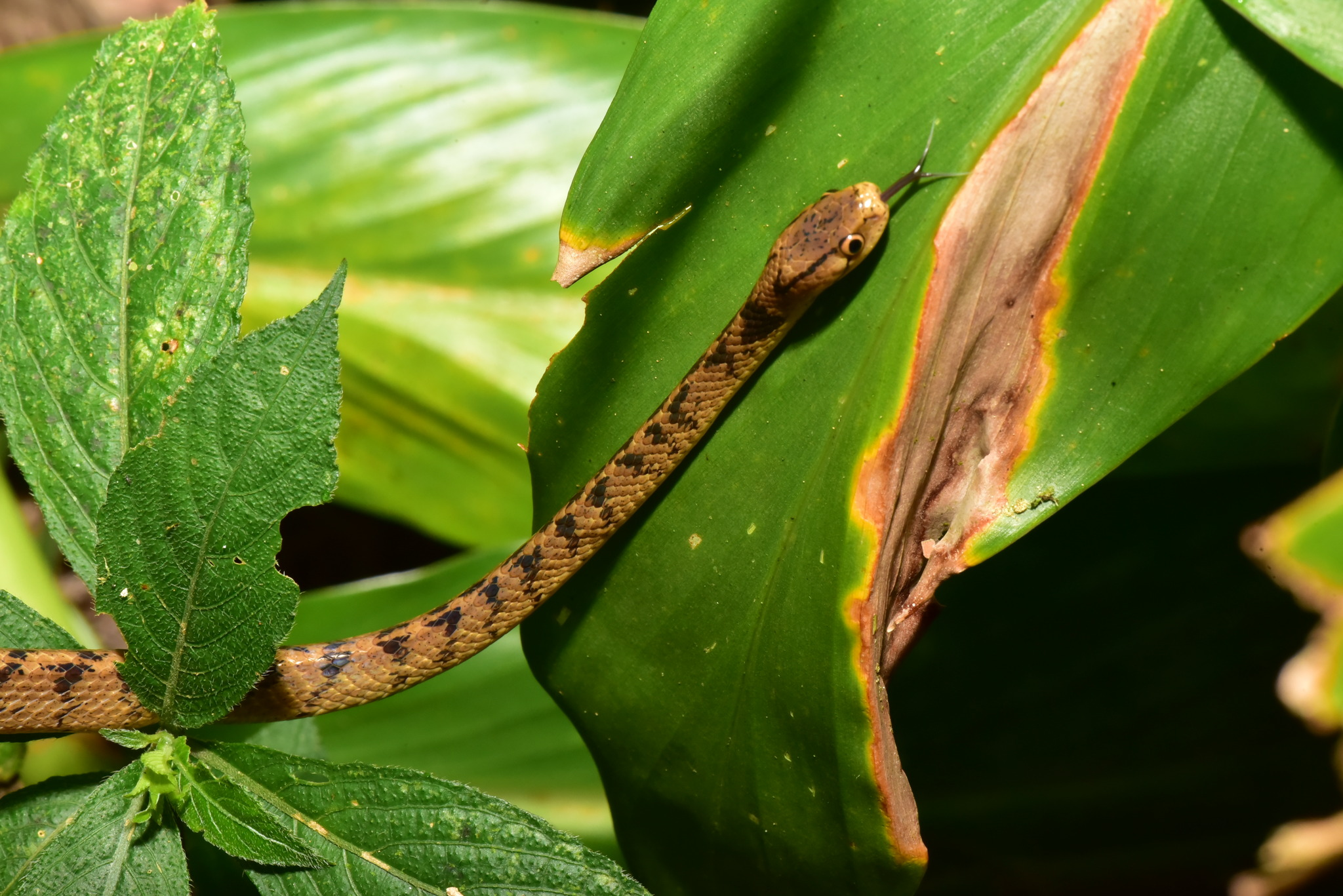

Scientific classification
- Domain: Eukaryota
- Kingdom: Animalia
- Phylum: Chordata
- Class: Reptilia
- Order: Squamata
- Suborder: Serpentes
- Family: Pareidae
- Genus: Pareas
- Species: P. atayal

Binomial name
- Pareas atayal You, Poyarkov, & Lin, 2015

= Pareas atayal =

Species of snake

Pareas atayal, also known as the Atayal slug-eating snake, is a small, harmless snake endemic to Taiwan.

== Description ==
Pareas atayal is a slender, yellow-brown snake which may reach about 50 cm (20 in) in length. Its dorsum is primarily yellow-brown or ochre with slightly lighter flanks and a yellow-white or crème belly and chin. Clear, darkly-colored vertical bars mark the sides of this snake, each being roughly two scales wide.

Very small brownish dots dust the flanks and dorsum of the snake, where the flanks possess less than the dorsum and the ventral surface possesses less than the flanks. Two very thin, but well-defined black stripes stem from the lower and upper edges of each postorbital scale.

The lower postorbital stripe reaches the anterior part of the seventh supralabial scale, but does not continue to the lower jaw or chin. The upper postorbital stripes meet at the base of the head, forming an M-shaped arch.

== Behaviour ==
Like others of its genus, P. atayal is a nocturnal, invertebrate-eating snake with a preference for land snails and slugs.

== Etymology ==
Pareas atayal is named after the native Taiwan aboriginal people, the Atayal, as they inhabit the same mountainous regions of northern Taiwan.
