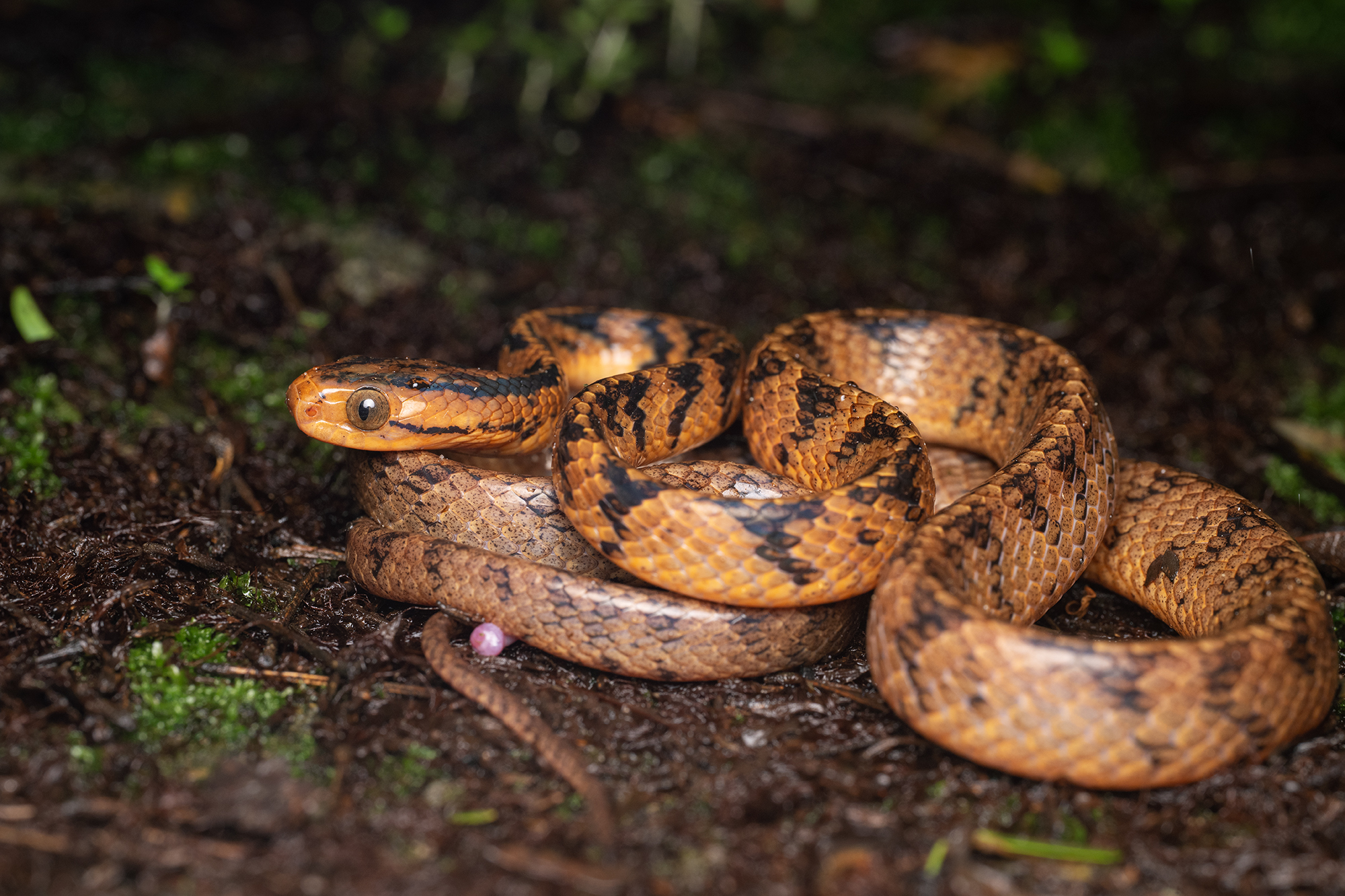

Conservation status
- Least Concern (IUCN 3.1)

Scientific classification
- Kingdom: Animalia
- Phylum: Chordata
- Class: Reptilia
- Order: Squamata
- Suborder: Serpentes
- Family: Pareidae
- Genus: Pareas
- Species: P. monticola

Binomial name
- Pareas monticola (Cantor, 1839)

Synonyms
- Dipsas monticola

= Common slug snake =

Species of snake

The common slug snake, Assam snail eater, Assam snail-eater snake, or montane slug-eating snake (Pareas monticola) is a species of snake found in Northeast India (Sikkim, Assam, Meghalaya, Mizoram, Darjeeling, Arunachal Pradesh), eastern Nepal, Bhutan, China (Tibet, Yunnan), Myanmar, and Vietnam. Its type locality is "Naga Hills, Asám" (=Assam), India. It is also reported from north-eastern and south-eastern Bangladesh. The species was first described by Theodore Cantor in 1839.

Pareas monticola is a nocturnal and arboreal snake that typically occurs in low vegetation and preys on slugs and snails.
