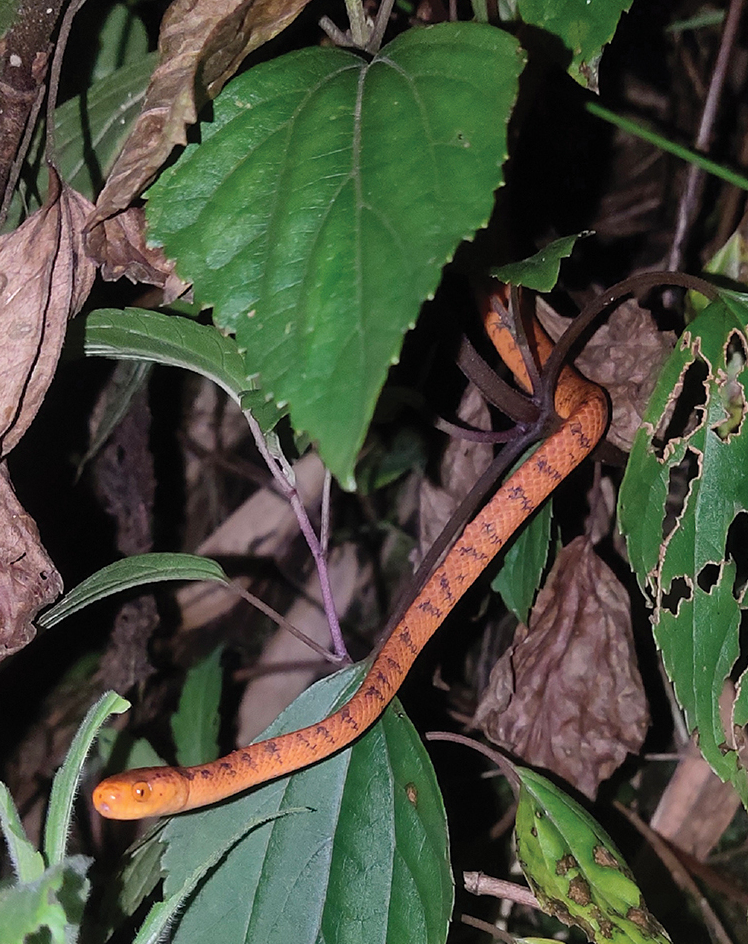

Conservation status
- Data Deficient (IUCN 3.1)

Scientific classification
- Kingdom: Animalia
- Phylum: Chordata
- Class: Reptilia
- Order: Squamata
- Suborder: Serpentes
- Family: Pareidae
- Genus: Pareas
- Species: P. xuelinensis

Binomial name
- Pareas xuelinensis Liu & Rao, 2021

= Pareas xuelinensis =

Species of snake

Pareas xuelinensis is a small, harmless slug-eating snake native to Yunnan, China.

== Description ==
P. xuelinensis is a small snake whose scales are dusted with many small, black dots. The top of P. xuelinensis is typically orange, while the belly and sides are yellow-orange. Its irises are orange, but the pupil is black. A thin, broken, black stripe extends from the postocular scale on each side of the head to the beginning of the neck, where they connect to a much thicker line which curves forward toward the parietals. Many irregular, vertical black stripes mark the snake's sides and tail, but do not connect across the vertebral scales.

== Behaviour ==
Like others of its genus, P. xuelinensis is a nocturnal invertebrate-eating snake.

== Etymology ==
The specific epithet xuelinensis refers to Xuelin Township, the type locality of the species.
