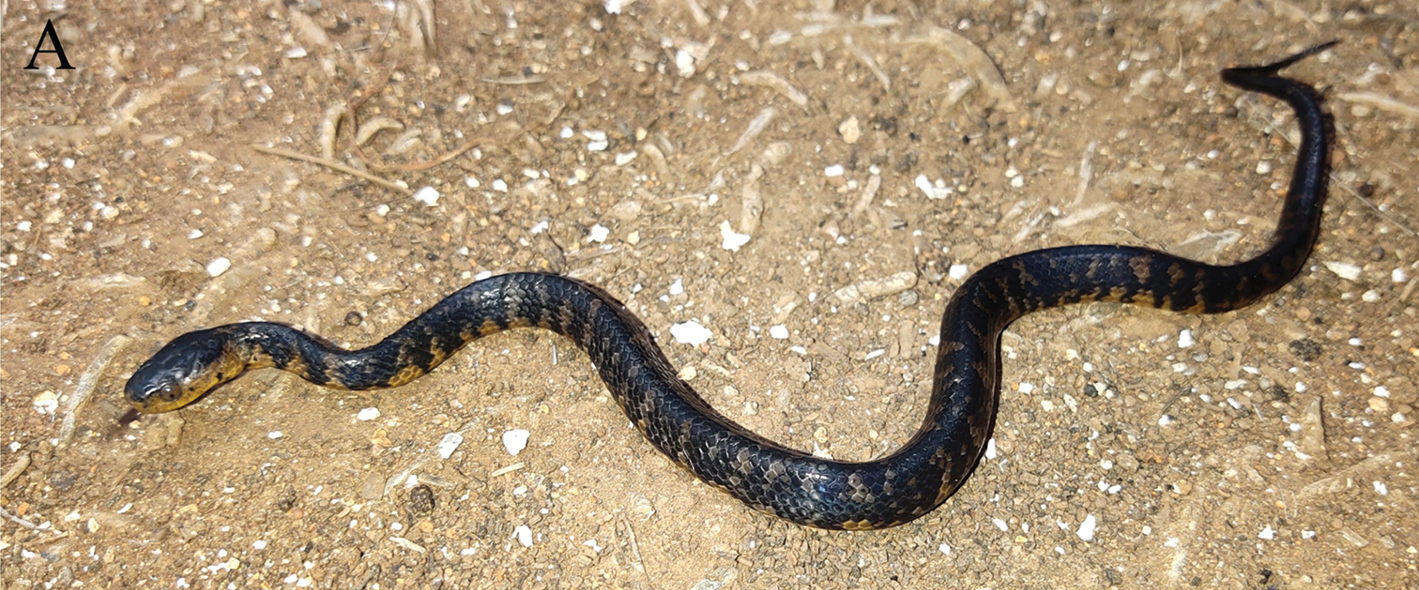

Conservation status
- Least Concern (IUCN 3.1)

Scientific classification
- Kingdom: Animalia
- Phylum: Chordata
- Class: Reptilia
- Order: Squamata
- Suborder: Serpentes
- Family: Pareidae
- Genus: Pareas
- Species: P. niger

Binomial name
- Pareas niger (Pope, 1928)

Synonyms
- Amblycephalus niger; Pareas mengziensis

= Pareas niger =

Snake endemic to China

Pareas niger, also known as the black snail-eating snake and the Mengzi snail-eating snake, is a non-venomous species of snake endemic to Yunnan, China.

== Description ==
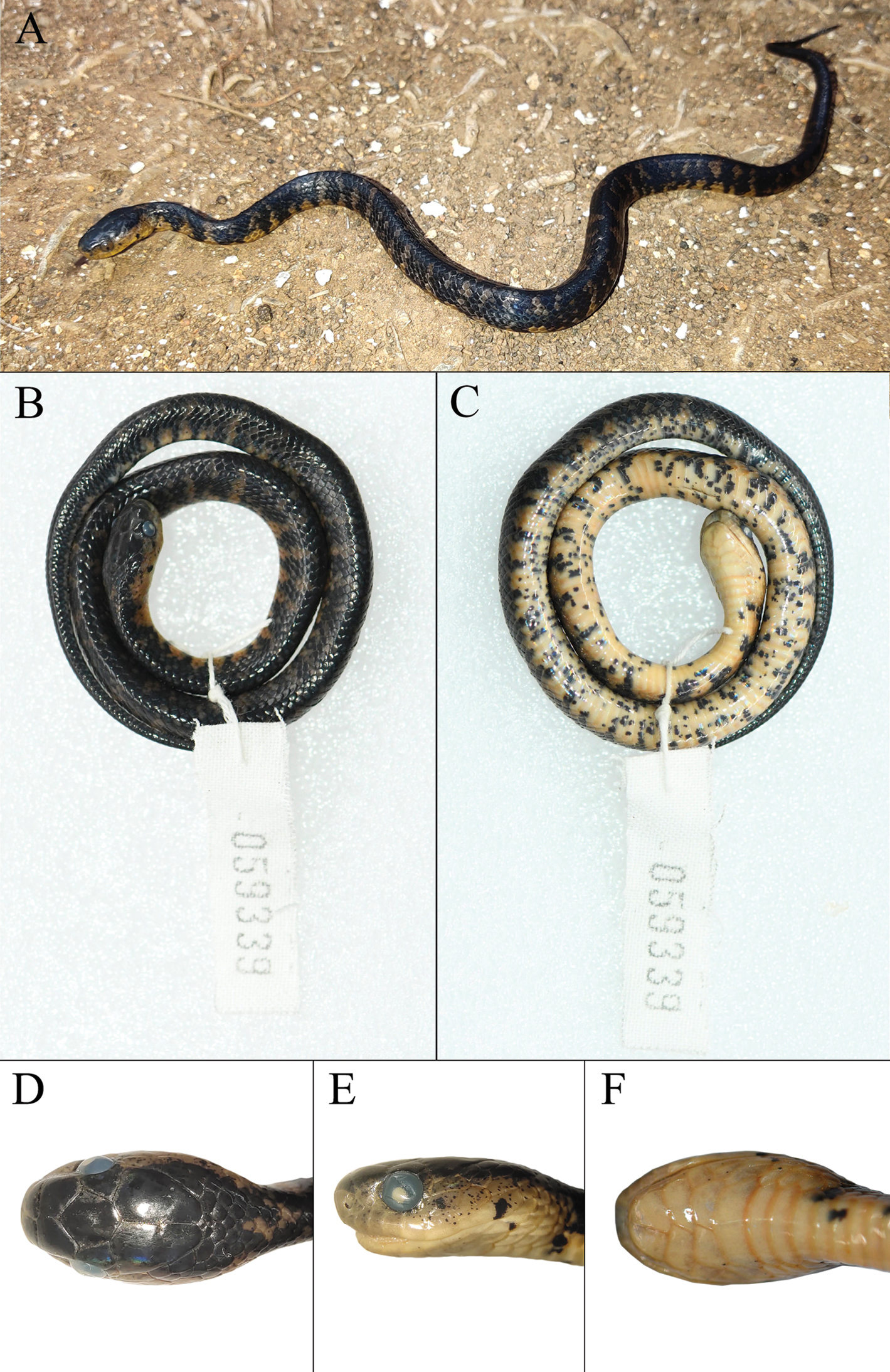
Pareas niger

Pareas niger has a black tail and a largely black dorsum. Its loreal scales do not touch the eyes, and 7 rows of scales are keeled at the mid-body. The solid black top of its head extends to the loreal and lower anterior temporal scales where it breaks down into dots, continuing to break down into scattered speckling at the lower labial scales.

The black of its neck and back is interrupted by irregular light areas that reach upward from the similarly light ventral scales in broken bands that grow stronger toward the snake's posterior. The belly is light except for irregular, sparse mottling.

== Behaviour ==
Like other snakes in its genus, P. niger is a nocturnal, oviparous, mostly arboreal snail and slug-eating snake.

== Distribution ==
Best recorded in deciduous broadleaf forests with subtropical monsoon climates near Mengzi City, its ideal elevation is roughly 1,900 metres above sea level, though it is likely to occur in the plateaus surrounding Mengzi as well.

== Etymology ==
The species name niger comes from the Latin word for black.
