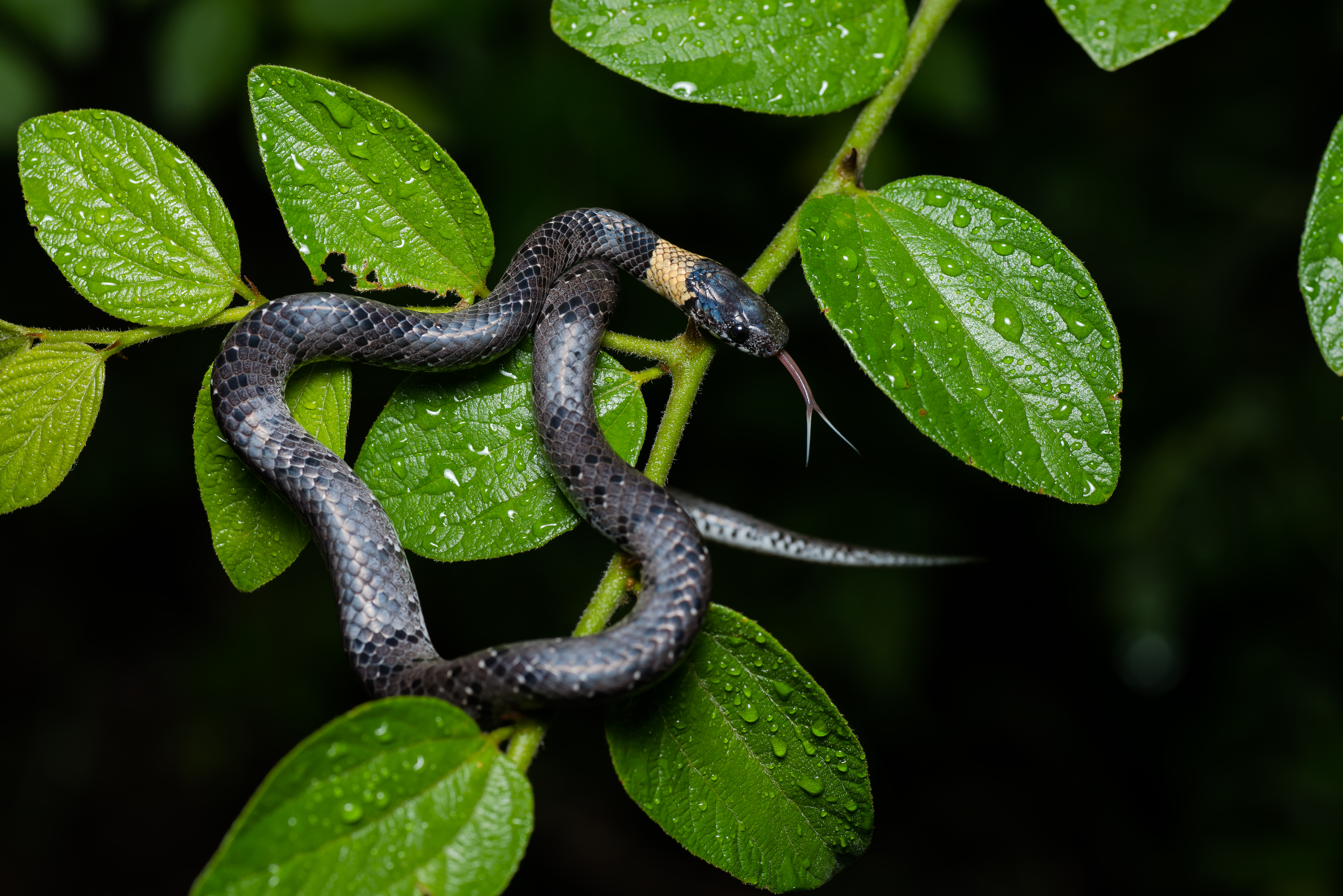
- Pareas margaritophorus

Conservation status
- Least Concern (IUCN 3.1)

Scientific classification
- Kingdom: Animalia
- Phylum: Chordata
- Class: Reptilia
- Order: Squamata
- Suborder: Serpentes
- Family: Pareidae
- Genus: Pareas
- Species: P. margaritophorus

Binomial name
- Pareas margaritophorus (Jan, 1866)

Synonyms
- Leptognathus margaritophorus Jan, 1866; Pares Moellendorffi Boettger, 1885; Amblycephalus tamdaoensis Bourret, 1935; Pareas margaritophorus — Smith, 1943; Dipsas margaritophorus — Nguyen and Ho, 1996

= Mountain slug snake =

Spotted slug snake

Species of snake

The mountain slug snake (Pareas margaritophorus), also known as the white-spotted slug snake, is a small, harmless species of snake that is rather common in South, South-East, and East Asia, and feeds on small invertebrates.

== Characteristics ==
Mountain slug snakes are forest-dwellers that are about small to medium-sized. They have fangs that are located on their lower jaw in which they can use to remove the snail from their shells to eat. They have blunt heads that are wider than their actual body width. It averages about 47 cm in length and can be spotted by its collar that can be yellow or orange with a grey or brown body. It also has black scales with a pale underside with dark spots.

== Habits ==
The mountain slug snake is a nocturnal species that is active on the forest floor or on shallow vegetation that are usually found in lowland or lower mountain forests that are at the elevation of 1500 meters.

== Diet ==
Mountain slug snakes feed on the following invertebrates:

- snails
- slugs
- earthworms

== Distribution ==
It is found in NE India, Myanmar, Thailand, Peninsular Malaysia, Laos, Cambodia, Vietnam, Hong Kong, and China.

== External references ==
- photo
