= Pareas nigriceps =

Conservation status
- Least Concern (IUCN 3.1)

Scientific classification
- Kingdom: Animalia
- Phylum: Chordata
- Class: Reptilia
- Order: Squamata
- Suborder: Serpentes
- Family: Pareidae
- Genus: Pareas
- Species: P. nigriceps

Binomial name
- Pareas nigriceps Guo & Deng, 2009

Species of snake

Pareas nigriceps, also known as the Xiaoheishan slug-eater snake, is a small, harmless snake native to Yunnan, China- particularly the Gaoligong Mountains.

== Description ==
P. nigriceps is easily distinguished from others in Pareas by the large, black oval on the top of its head, as well as the two rounded black spots on each side of the head. The head spots are separated from the nuchal band.

== Etymology ==
The species name nigriceps refers to the large black spot on top of the head.
