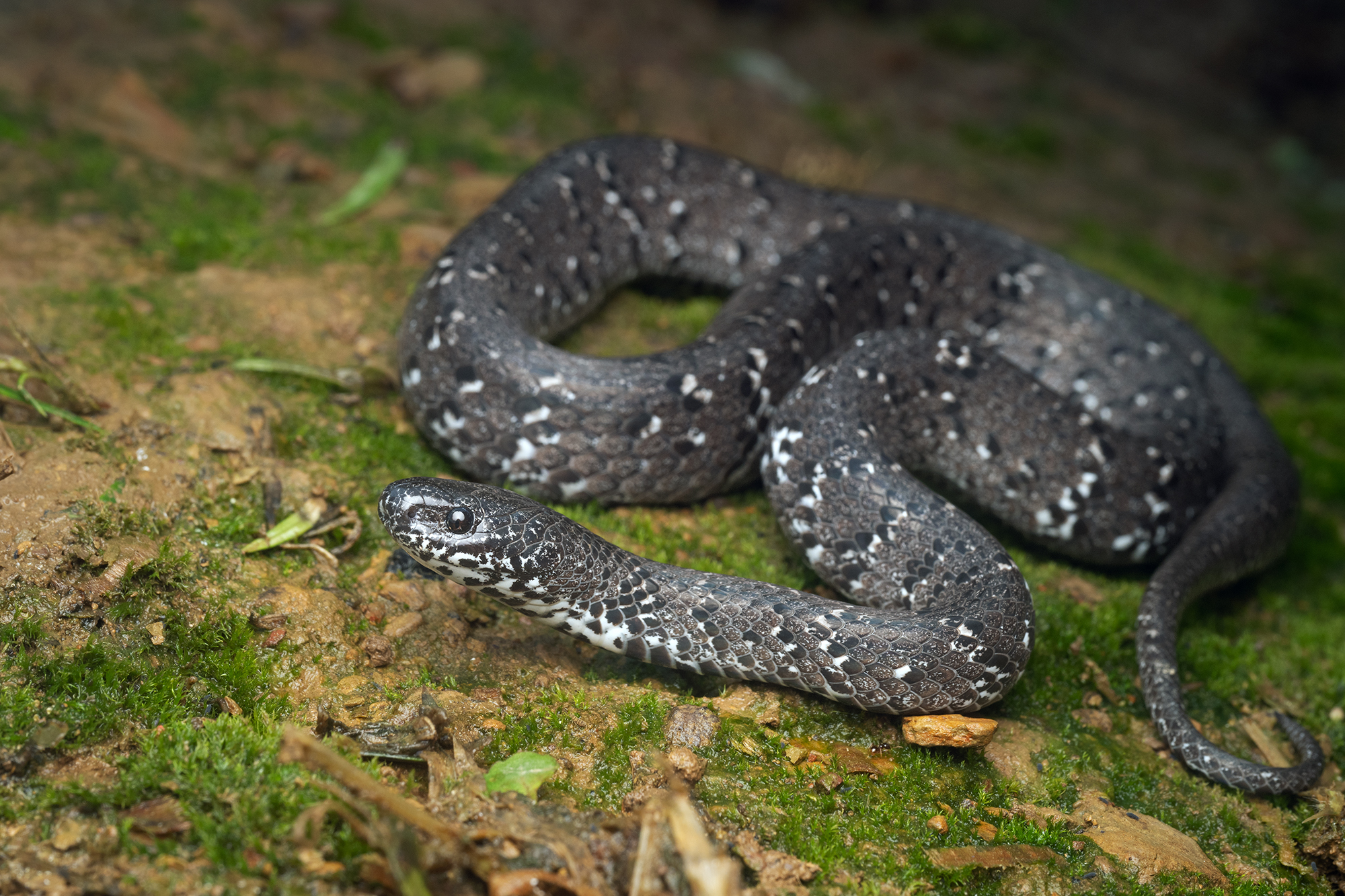

Scientific classification
- Kingdom: Animalia
- Phylum: Chordata
- Class: Reptilia
- Order: Squamata
- Suborder: Serpentes
- Family: Pareidae
- Genus: Pareas
- Species: P. andersonii

Binomial name
- Pareas andersonii Boulenger, 1888

Synonyms
- List: Pareas andersonii Boulenger, 1888; Amblycephalus andersoni Wall, 1908; Pareas macularius Smith, 1943; Amblycephalus andersoni Deuve, 1961; Pareas macularius Wogan et al., 2008; Pareas macularius Wallach et al., 2014; Pareas margaritophorus akzuala & Lalremsanga, 2019; Pareas macularius Deepak et al., 2020; Pareas margaritophorus Li et al., 2020; Pareas andersonii Vogel et al., 2020; Pareas (Eberhardtia) andersonii Poyarkov et al., 2022

= Pareas andersonii =

Species of snake

Pareas andersonii, also known as Anderson's slug snake, is a small, non-venomous snake found in India (Nagaland and Mizoram), northern Myanmar, and China (Yunnan).

== Description ==
Mostly dark grey with a bluish sheen, vertical black and white stripes color the dorsum and sides of P. andersonii, but lose their form closer to the posterior end to instead become random speckling.

The top of its head is dark grey with many black spots, lacking a nuchal spot or collar. The sides of its head have dense white mottling, including mostly-white labial scales with black spots around the edges. The ventral part of its head is white or beige with black mottling while the rest of the ventrum white or beige with many black rectangular spots across the ventral shields.

== Behaviour ==
Like others in Pareas, P. andersonii is a semi-arboreal, nocturnal snake primarily preying upon land snails and slugs.

== Etymology ==
Named in honor of John Anderson (1833–1900).
