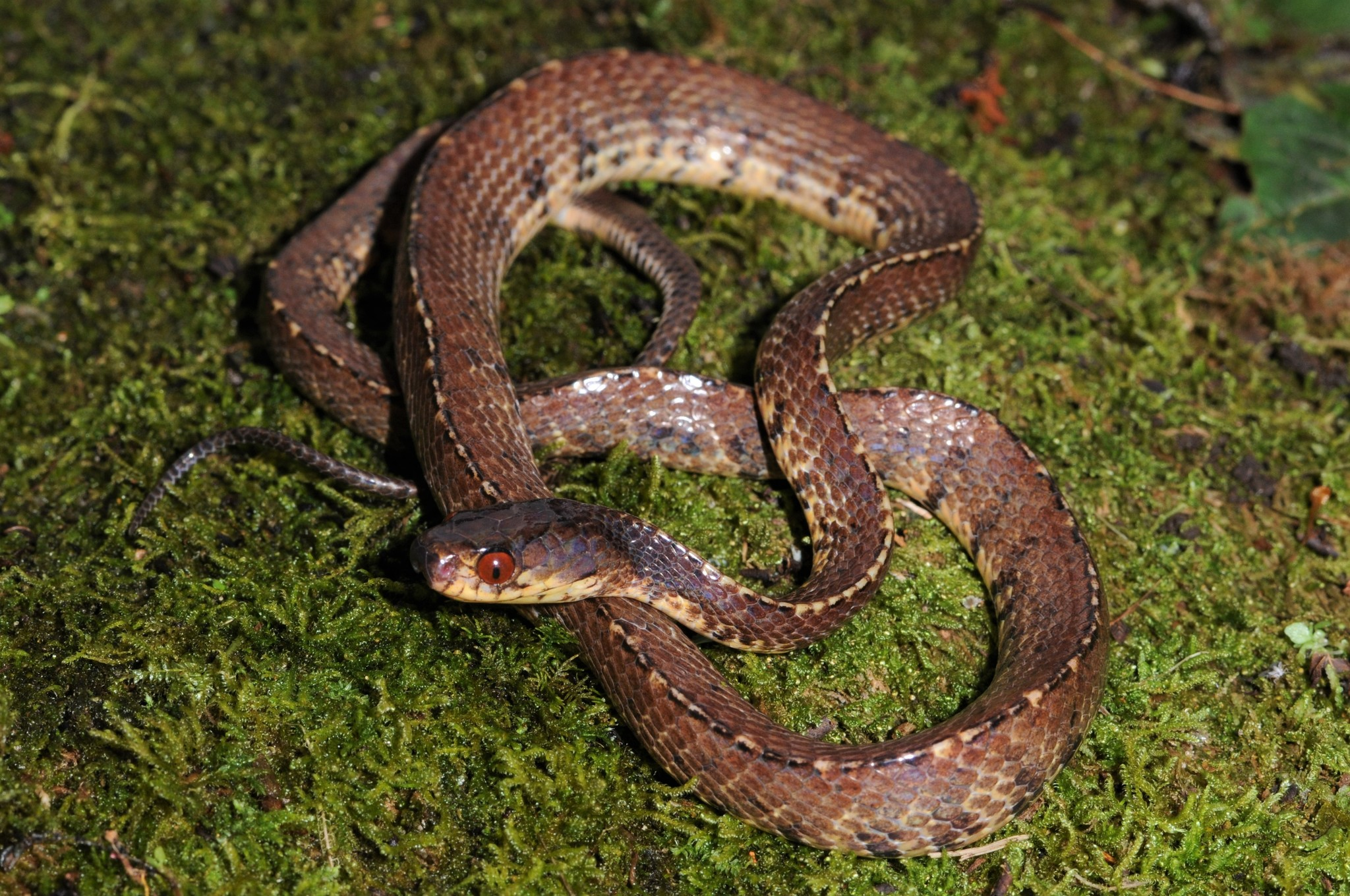
- Mountain Slug Snake, a member of the genus

Scientific classification
- Domain: Eukaryota
- Kingdom: Animalia
- Phylum: Chordata
- Class: Reptilia
- Order: Squamata
- Suborder: Serpentes
- Family: Pareidae
- Genus: Asthenodipsas; Peters, 1864

= Asthenodipsas =

Genus of snakes

Asthenodipsas is a genus of snakes of the family Pareidae.

== Species ==
- Asthenodipsas borneensis Quah, Grismer, Lim, Anuar, & Chan, 2020 – Bornean dark-necked slug snake
- Asthenodipsas ingeri Quah, Lim & Grismer, 2021
- Asthenodipsas jamilinaisi Quah, Grismer, Lim, Anuar, & Imbun, 2019
- Asthenodipsas laevis (Boie, 1827)
- Asthenodipsas lasgalenensis Loredo, Wood, Quah, Anuar, Greer, Ahmad & Grismer, 2013
- Asthenodipsas malaccanus Peters, 1864
- Asthenodipsas stuebingi Quah, Grismer, Lim, Anuar, & Imbun, 2019
- Asthenodipsas tropidonotus (Lidth De Jeude, 1923)
- Asthenodipsas vertebralis (Boulenger, 1900)
