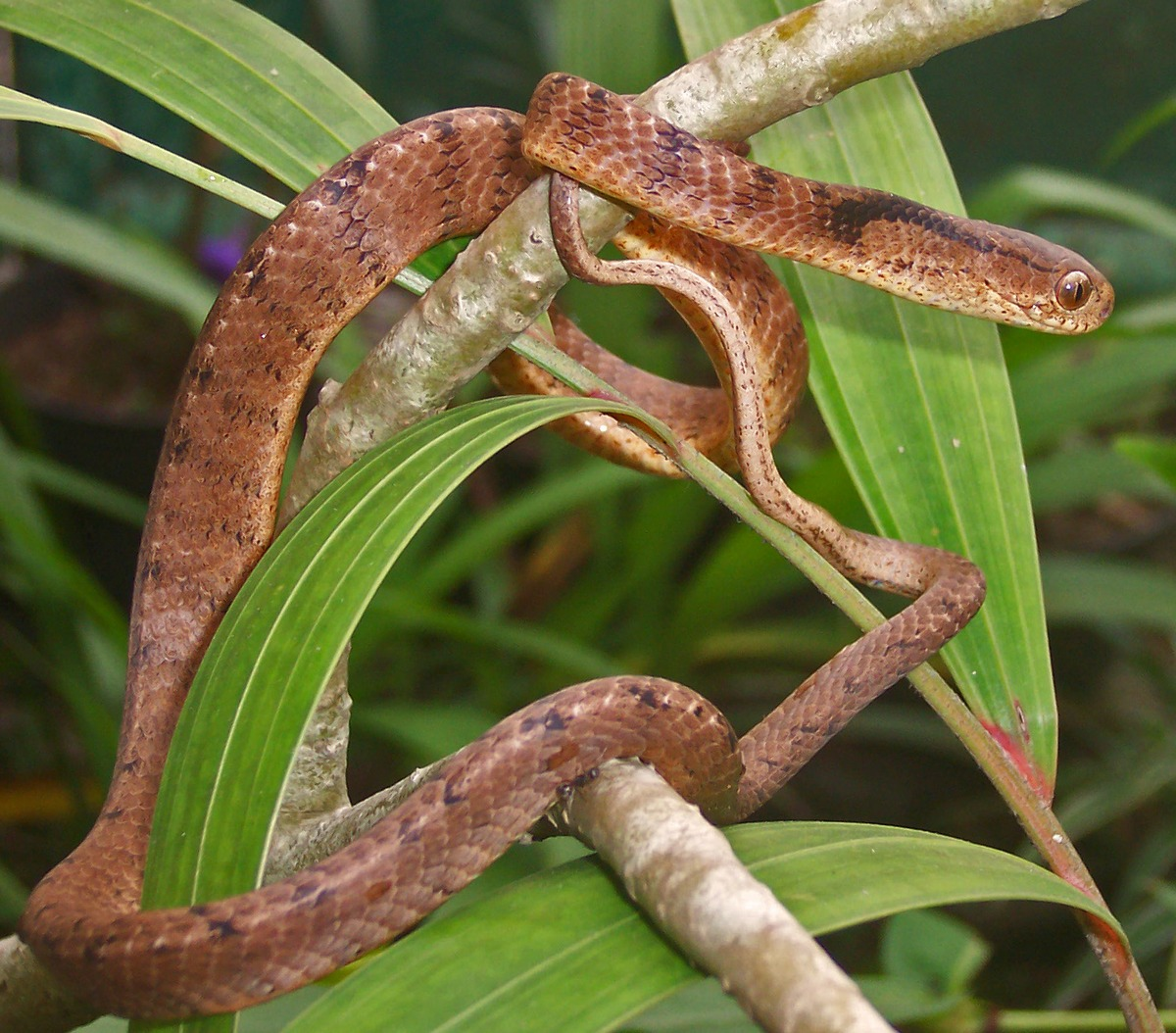
- Pareas carinatus

Scientific classification
- Kingdom: Animalia
- Phylum: Chordata
- Class: Reptilia
- Order: Squamata
- Suborder: Serpentes
- Family: Pareidae
- Genus: Pareas; Wagler, 1830

Species
- 30 recognized species, see article.

= Pareas =

Genus of snakes

Pareas is a genus of Asian snakes in the family Pareidae. Members of the genus are dietary specialists mainly or exclusively feeding on snails (limaxivory), hence their common name, slug snakes. All species in the genus Pareas are harmless to humans.

== Species ==
Pareas contains the following species:

- Pareas abros Poyarkov, Nguyen, Pawangkhanant, Yushchenko, Brakels, Nguyen, Nguyen, Suwannapoom, Orlov, & Vogel, 2022
- Pareas andersonii Boulenger, 1888 – Anderson's slug snake
- Pareas atayal You, Poyarkov & Lin, 2015 – Atayal slug-eating snake
- Pareas baiseensis Wu, Gong, Huang, & Xu, 2023
- Pareas berdmorei Theobald, 1868 – Mengla snail-eating snake
- Pareas boulengeri (Angel, 1920) – Boulenger's slug snake
- Pareas capitulatus Stuart et al. 2025 - narrow-headed snail-eating snake
- Pareas carinatus (H. Boie, 1828) – keeled slug snake
- Pareas chinensis (Barbour, 1912) – Chinese slug snake
- Pareas dulongjiangensis Liu, Yang, Rao, Guo, & Rao. 2023 – Dulongjiang slug‐eating snake
- Pareas formosensis (Van Denburgh, 1909) – Formosa slug snake, Taiwan slug snake
- Pareas guanyinshanensis Liu, Yang, Rao, Guo, & Rao, 2023 – Guanyinshan slug-eating snake
- Pareas hamptoni (Boulenger, 1905) – Hampton's slug snake
- Pareas iwasakii (Maki, 1937)
- Pareas kaduri Bhosale, Phansalkar, Sawant, Gowande, Patel & Mirza, 2020
- Pareas komaii (Maki, 1931) – Formosa slug snake
- Pareas kuznetsovorum Poyarkov, Nguyen, Pawangkhanant, Yushchenko, Brakels, Nguyen, Nguyen, Suwannapoom, Orlov, & Vogel, 2022
- Pareas macularius Theobald, 1868 – mountain slug snake
- Pareas margaritophorus (Jan, 1866) – mountain slug snake
- Pareas modestus (Theobald, 1868)
- Pareas monticola (Cantor, 1839) – common slug snake
- Pareas niger (Pope, 1928) – black snail-eating snake, Mengzi snail-eating snake
- Pareas nigriceps Guo & Deng, 2009 – Xiaoheishan slug-eater snake
- Pareas nuchalis (Boulenger, 1900)
- Pareas stanleyi (Boulenger, 1914) – Stanley's slug snake
- Pareas temporalis Le, Tran, Hoang, & Stuart, 2021
- Pareas tigerinus Liu, Zhang, Poyarkov, Hou, Wu, Rao, Nguyen & Vogel, 2023 – tiger slug‐eating snake
- Pareas victorianus G. Vogel, T.V. Nguyen, Zaw & Poyarkov, 2020 – Victoria slug snake
- Pareas vindumi G. Vogel, 2015 – Vindum's slug eater
- Pareas xuelinensis Liu & Rao, 2021
- Pareas yunnanensis Vogt, 1922 – Yunnan slug snake
- Pareas melanops Liu, Li, Yang & Rao, 2025

Nota bene: A binomial authority in parentheses indicates that the species was originally described in a genus other than Pareas.
