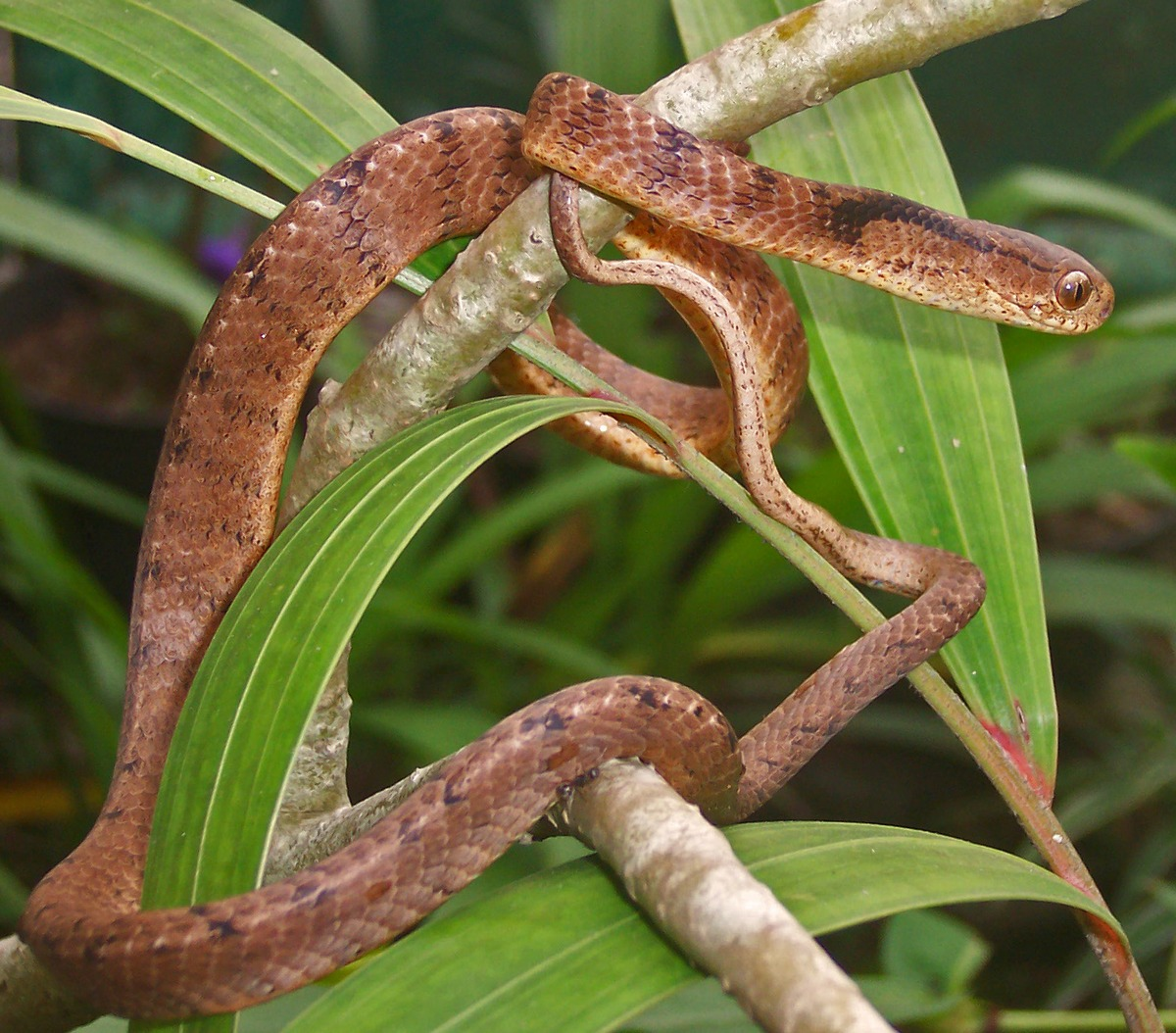

Conservation status
- Least Concern (IUCN 3.1)

Scientific classification
- Kingdom: Animalia
- Phylum: Chordata
- Class: Reptilia
- Order: Squamata
- Suborder: Serpentes
- Family: Pareidae
- Genus: Pareas
- Species: P. carinatus

Binomial name
- Pareas carinatus (Boie, 1828)

Synonyms
- Amblycephalus carinatus Boie, 1828

= Pareas carinatus =

Keeled slug-eating snake

Species of snake

The keeled slug-eating snake (Pareas carinatus) is a species of snake in the family Pareidae. It is relatively widespread in Southeast Asia, from southern China (Yunnan) to Burma and Indochina to the Malay Archipelago (Borneo, Java, Lombok, Sumatra, Bali). Two subspecies are recognized: P. c. carinatus and P. c. unicolor, the latter being confined to Cambodia.

Keeled slug-eating snakes live in or near forests. They are nocturnal and mostly arboreal, and as the common name suggests, they feed exclusively on snails and slugs. They are oviparous.

While the species is negatively affected by forest destruction, IUCN considers these effects to be localized and not threatening the species.

== Gallery ==
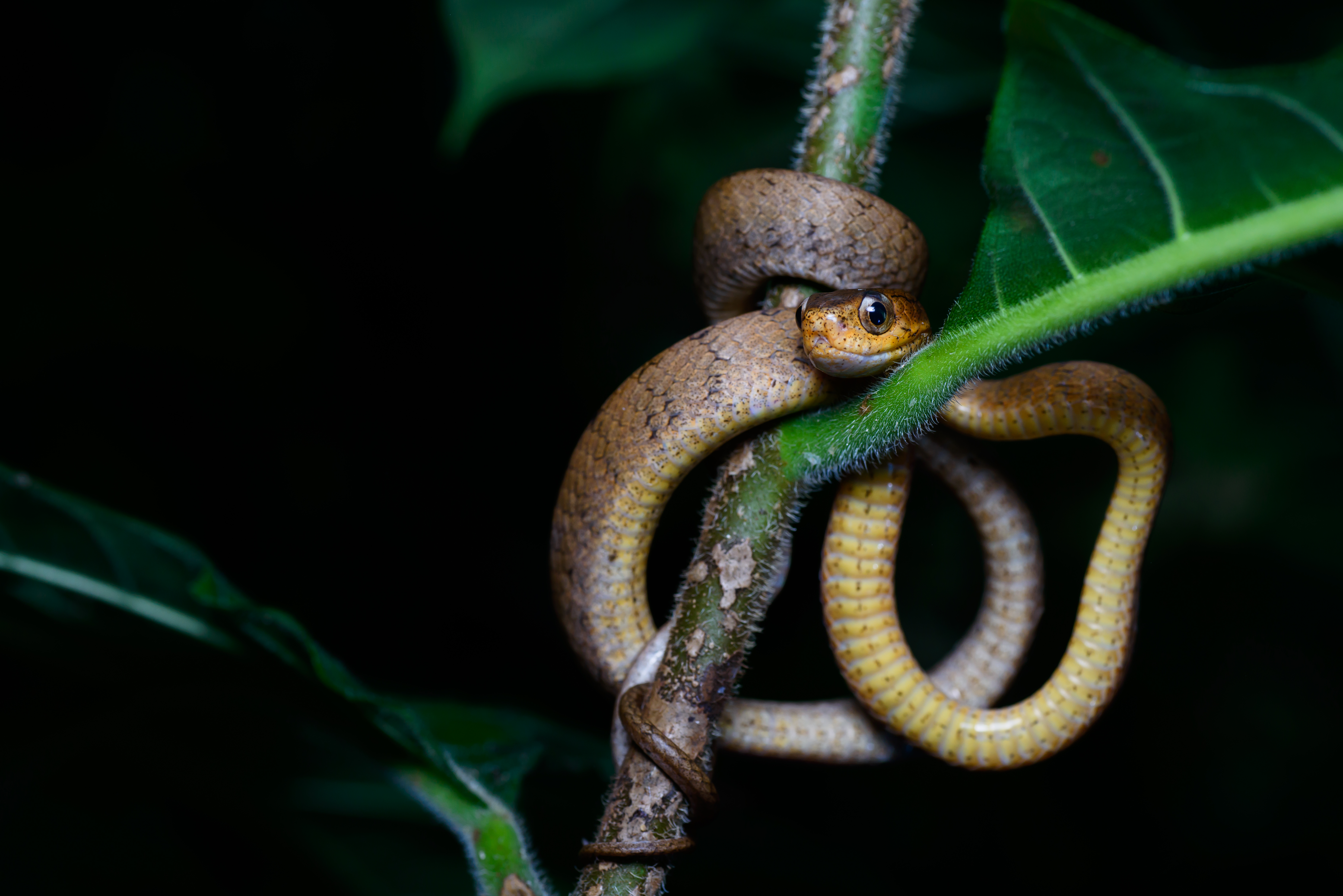
Khao Sok National Park

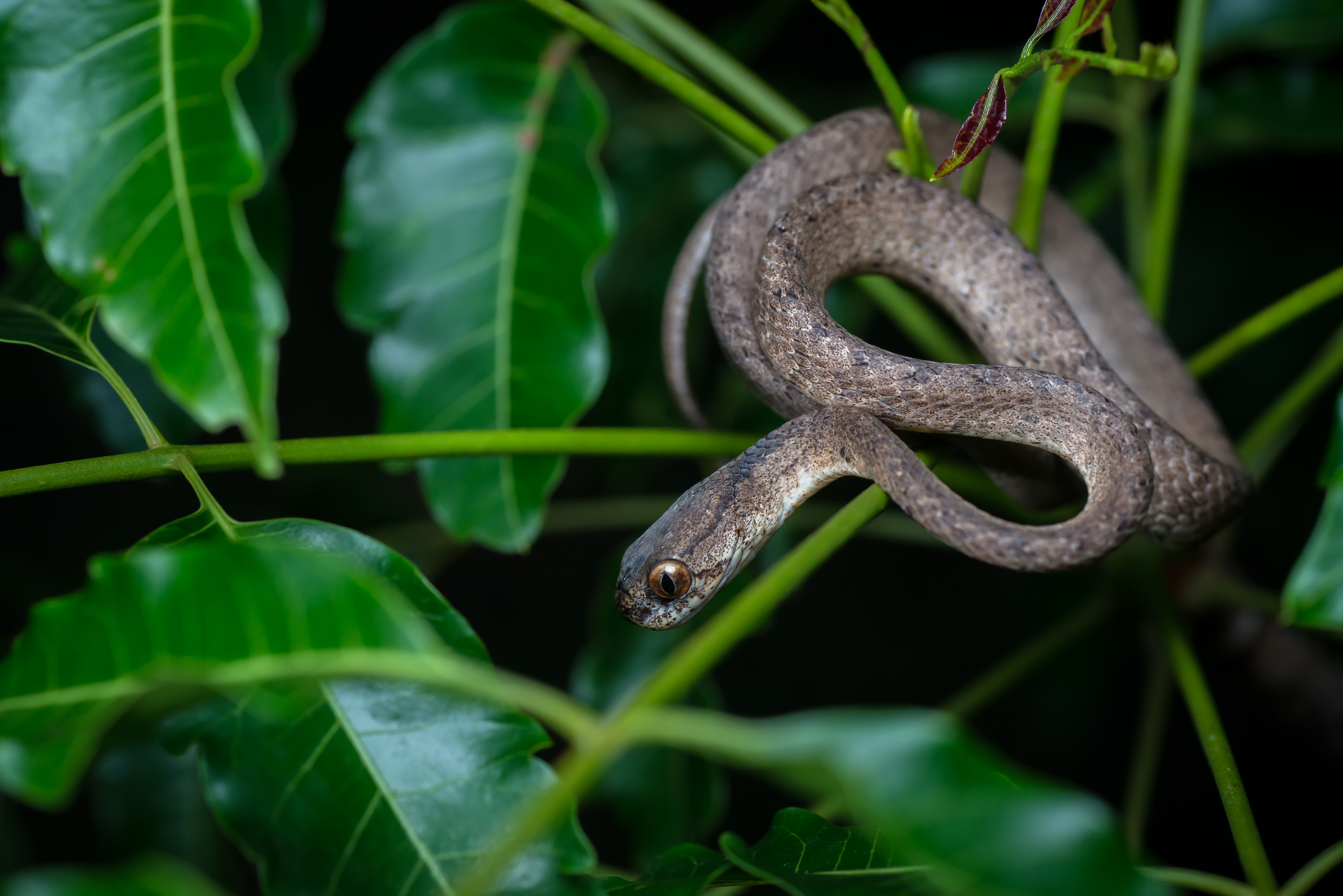
Kaeng Krachan District, Thailand

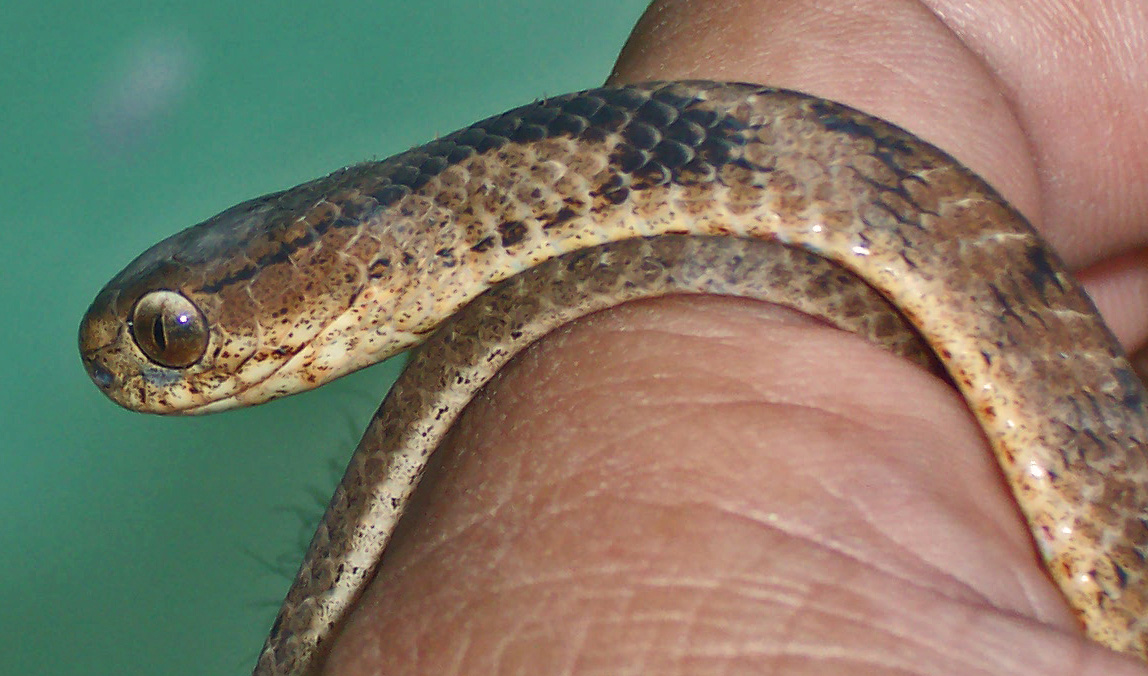

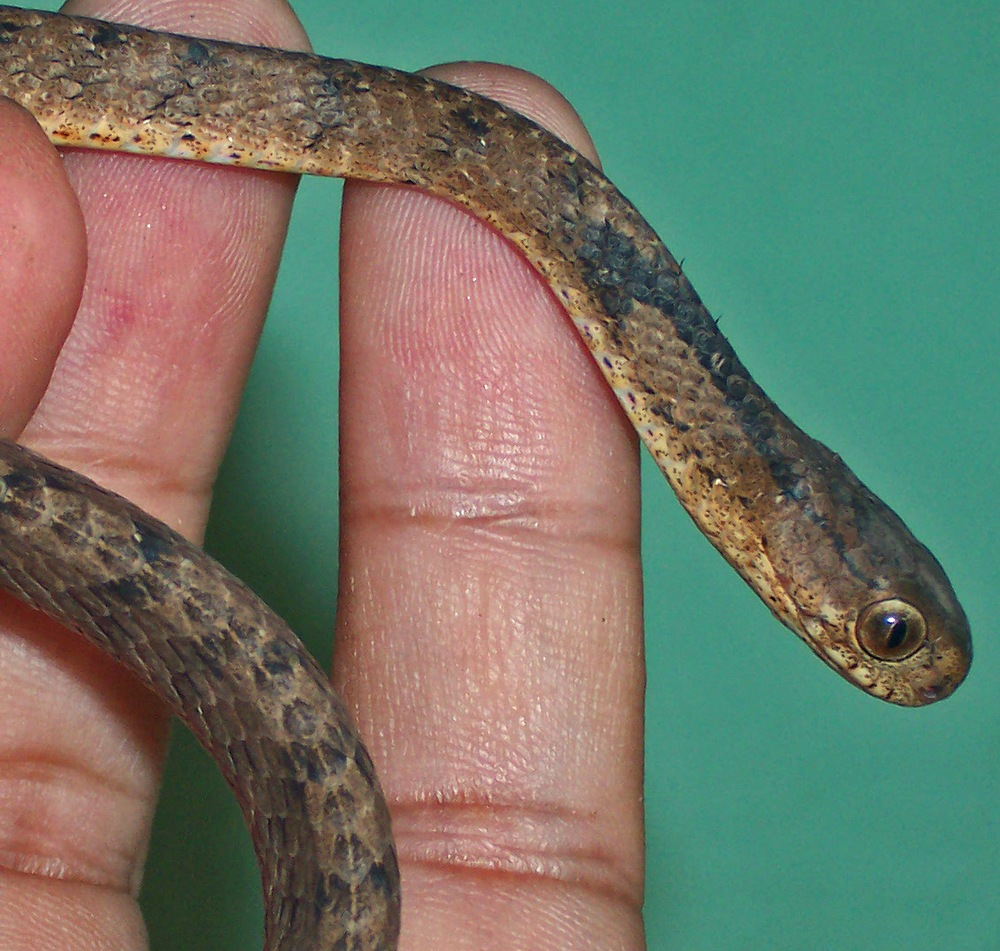

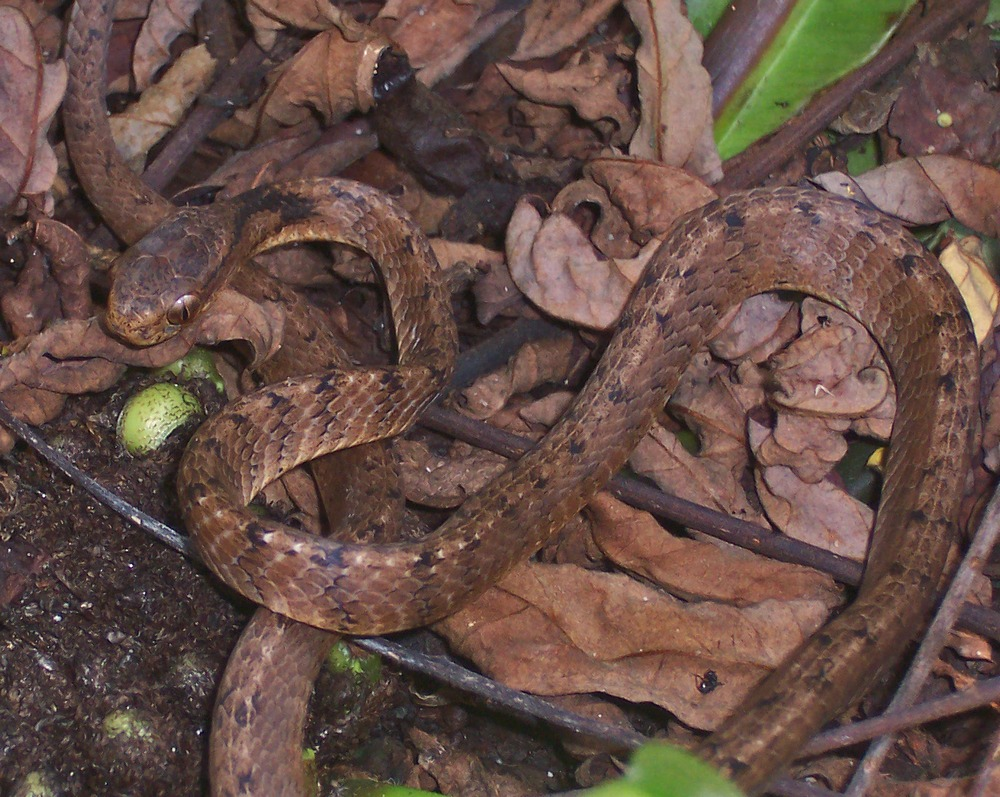
