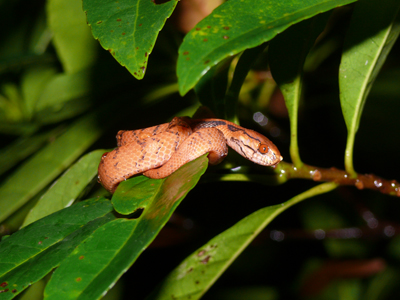

Conservation status
- Near Threatened (IUCN 3.1)

Scientific classification
- Kingdom: Animalia
- Phylum: Chordata
- Order: Squamata
- Suborder: Serpentes
- Family: Pareidae
- Genus: Pareas
- Species: P. iwasakii

Binomial name
- Pareas iwasakii (Maki, 1937)

Synonyms
- Amblycephalus formosensis iwasakii Maki, 1937; Pareas iwasakii — Takara, 1962

= Iwasaki's snail-eater =

Species of snake

Iwasaki's snail-eater (Pareas iwasakii) is a species of snake in the family Pareidae. The species is endemic to the Yaeyama Islands in the southern Ryukyu Islands, Japan.

== Etymology ==
The specific name, iwasakii, is in honor of Japanese meteorologist Takuji Iwasaki.

== Habitat ==
The preferred natural habitats of P. iwasakii are forest, shrubland, and grassland.

== Ecology ==
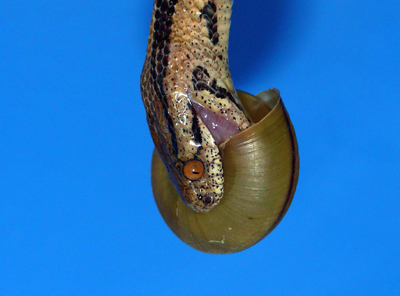
Snail-eater in action

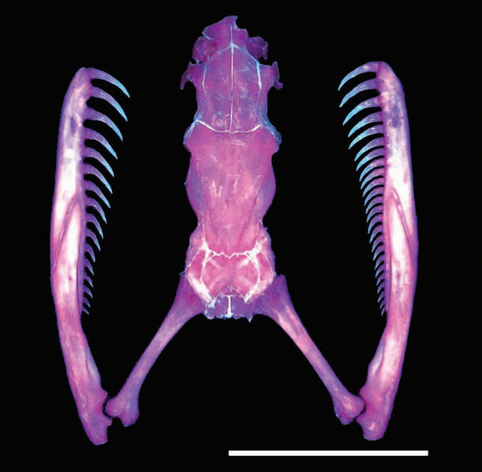
Skull of Pareas iwasakii

P. iwasakii is a snail-eating specialist; even newly hatched individuals feed on snails. It has asymmetric dentition on its jaws, with more teeth on the right mandible (about 25 teeth compared to 15 teeth on the left mandible) which facilitates feeding on snails with dextral (clockwise coiled) shells. A consequence of this asymmetry is that P. iwasakii is much less adept at preying on sinistral (counterclockwise coiled) snails. It systematically directs its attack on snails from the right in order to insert its lower jaw into the shell opening.

The selection pressure of this predator on snails of the genus Satsuma has led to a significant increase in the proportion of snails with left-facing shells, known as levogyres, compared to snails with right-facing shells, known as dextrogyres, because the two forms have difficulty mating with each other. This proportion is a local originality, the levorotatory form being very rare on a worldwide scale.

== Reproduction ==
P. iwasakii is oviparous.

== Taxonomy ==
Originally described as the subspecies Amblycephalus formosensis iwasakii by Moichirō Maki, it was placed in the genus Pareas and elevated to the species P. iwasakii by Tetsuo Takara in 1962.
