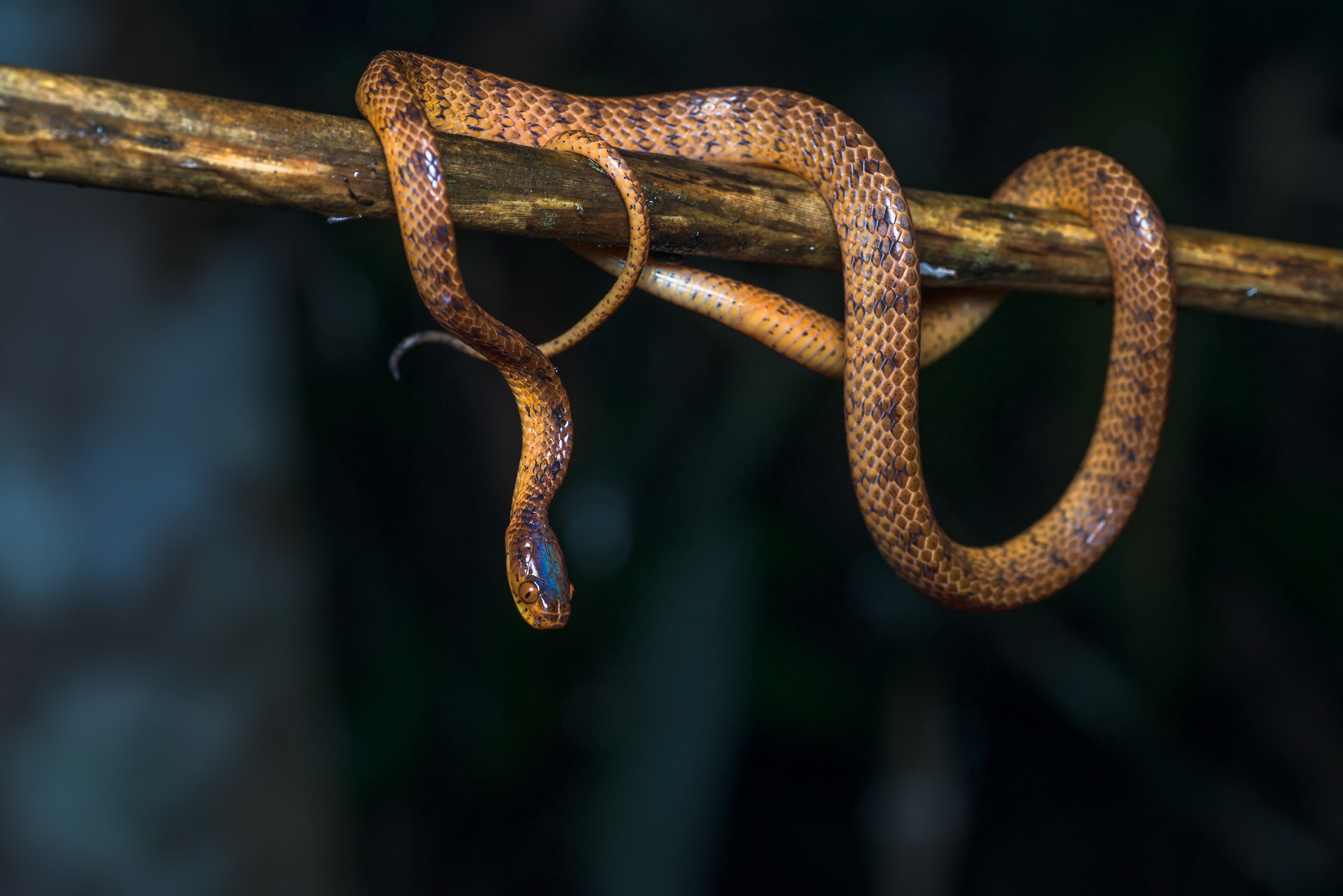

Conservation status
- Least Concern (IUCN 3.1)

Scientific classification
- Kingdom: Animalia
- Phylum: Chordata
- Class: Reptilia
- Order: Squamata
- Suborder: Serpentes
- Family: Pareidae
- Genus: Pareas
- Species: P. hamptoni

Binomial name
- Pareas hamptoni (Boulenger, 1905)

Synonyms
- Amblycephalus hamptoni Boulenger, 1905; Eberhardtia tonkinensis Angel, 1920; Amblycephalus carinatus hainanus M.A. Smith, 1923 (part.); Amblycephalus carinatus berdmorei M.A. Smith, 1930 (part.) [non Pareas berdmorei Theobald, 1868 = Pareas carinatus Wagler, 1830]; Pareas hamptoni — M.A. Smith, 1943; Dipsas hamptoni — Nguyen & Ho, 1996 (part.); Pareas hamptoni — Ziegler, 2002

= Pareas hamptoni =

Species of snake

Pareas hamptoni, also known commonly as Hampton's slug snake, is a species of snake in the family Pareidae. The species is native to Southeast Asia.

== Etymology ==
The specific name, hamptoni, is in honor of Herbert Hampton, collector of the holotype.

== Geographic range ==
P. hamptoni is found in Cambodia, China, Laos, Myanmar, Thailand, and Vietnam.

== Habitat ==
The preferred natural habitat of P. hamptoni is forest, at altitudes of 600–1,500 m (2,000–4,900 ft).

== Behavior ==
P. hamptoni is arboreal, and it is both diurnal and nocturnal.

== Diet ==
P. hamptoni preys upon slugs.

== Reproduction ==
P. hamptoni is oviparous.

== Original publication ==
- Boulenger GA (1905). "Descriptions of Two New Snakes from Upper Burma". Journal of the Bombay Natural History Society 16: 235–236. (Amblycephalus hamptoni, new species, p. 236 + Figure 2, five views). (archive.org).
