= Temporal scales =

Type of scales on reptiles

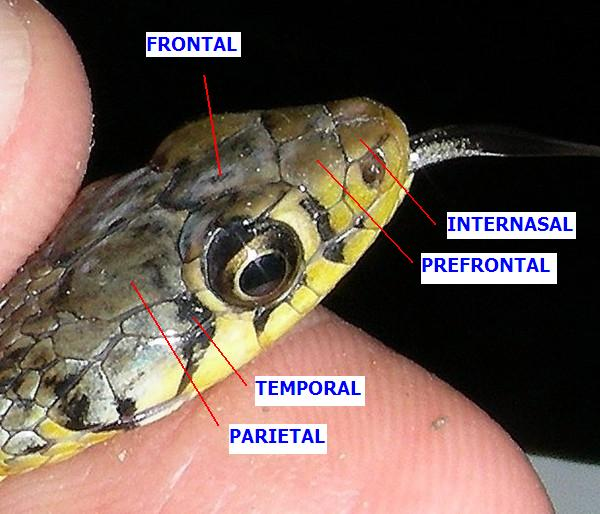
Nomenclature of scales (top view of head)

In reptiles, the temporal scales are located on the side of the head between the parietal scales and the supralabial scales, and behind the postocular scales.

There are two types of temporal scales:

- Anterior temporals are in contact with the postocular scales.
- Posterior temporals are in vertical rows not in contact with the postocular scales; sometimes called secondary and tertiary temporals.

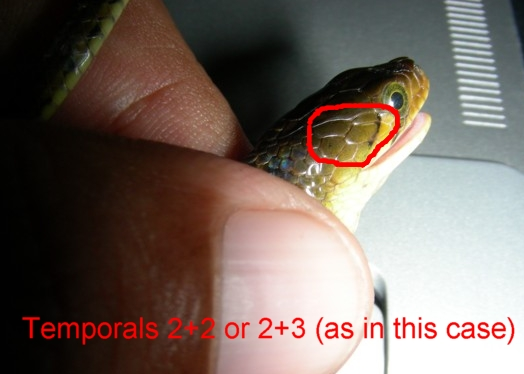
Chequered Keelback Xenochrophis piscator

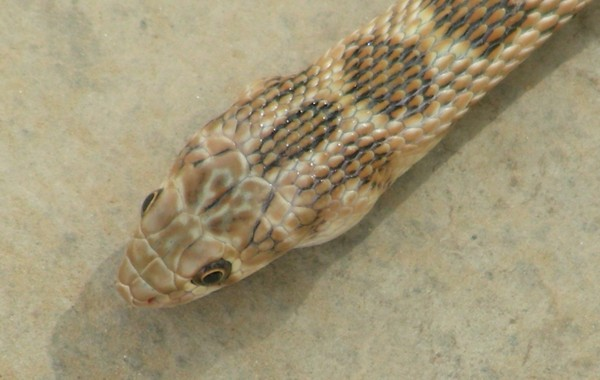
Glossy-bellied Racer Coluber ventromaculatus

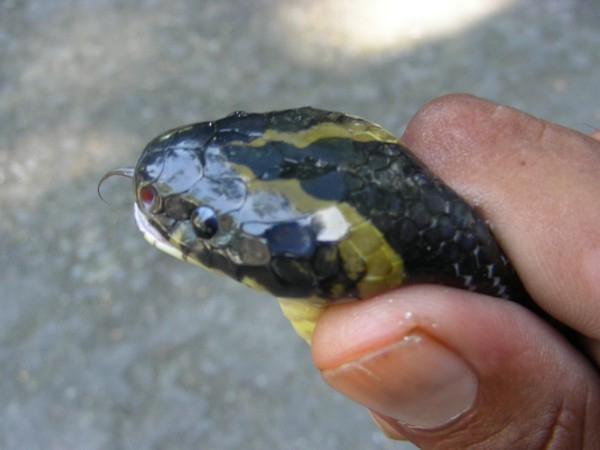
Banded Krait Bungarus fasciatus

== Related scales ==
- Parietal scales
- Supralabial scales
- Ocular scales

== See also ==
- Snake scales
- Anatomical terms of location
