= Vertebral scales =

Scales on the back of a snake

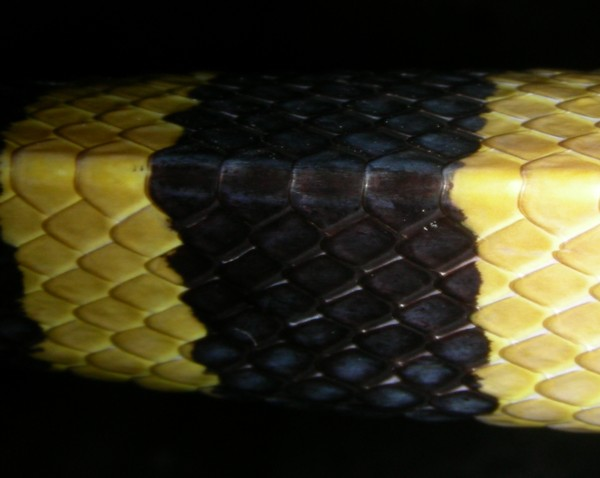
Enlarged vertebral scales of Banded Krait Bungarus fasciatus

Vertebral scales, in snakes, are large scales along the top of the back of the snake, i.e., the uppermost row. They are a specialised form of dorsal scales.

"Vertebral" is a term associated with the backbone, but also central scales such as on the carapace of a chelonian shell.

== Related scales ==
- Dorsal scales

== See also ==
- Snake scales
- Anatomical terms of location
