= Supralabial scale =

Type of scale in reptiles

In reptiles, the supralabial scales, also called upper-labials, are those scales that border the mouth opening along the upper jaw. They do not include the median scale (rostral scale). The term labial originates from Labium (Latin for "lip"), which refers to any lip-like structure. The numbers of these scales present, and sometimes the shapes and sizes, are some of many characteristics used to differentiate species from one another.

== Related scales ==
- Sublabial scales
- Rostral scale
- Mental scale

== See also ==
- Labial scales
- Snake scales
- Anatomical terms of location
