= Ocular scales =

Reptile scales forming the margin of the eye

In scaled reptiles, the ocular scales are those forming the margin of the eye. The name originates from the term oculus which is Latin for 'eye' and, in the broadest sense, refers to a scale associated with the eye. The number of these scales present, and sometimes the shapes and sizes, are some of the many characteristics used to differentiate species from one another.

Prefixes are usually included to indicate the positions or locations of the individual scales:

- Preocular scales, or preoculars, are those lying directly in front of and in contact with the eye.
- Postocular scales, or postoculars, are those lying directly behind and in contact with the eye.
- Supraocular scales, or supraoculars, are enlarged scales on the crown immediately above the eye.
- Subocular scales, or suboculars, are those lying directly below and in contact with the eye.

Collectively these scales are referred to as circumorbital scales, circumorbitals, or a circumorbital ring.

Occasionally, the term ocular scale is used without a prefix, in which case it specifically refers to the brille, also known as the spectacle or eyecap. This is a transparent scale that covers and protects the eye. It is formed in embryonic snakes when the transparent upper and lower eyelids fuse. Once hatched, a snake does not possess eyelids and the brille carries out some of these functions.

== See also ==
- Reptile scales
- Snake scales
- Anatomical terms of location
