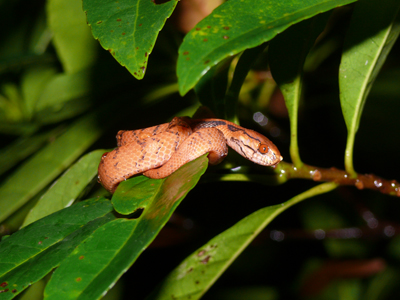
- Iwasaki's snail-eater (Pareas iwasakii)

Scientific classification
- Kingdom: Animalia
- Phylum: Chordata
- Class: Reptilia
- Order: Squamata
- Suborder: Serpentes
- Clade: Colubroides
- Family: Pareidae; Romer, 1956

Genera
- Aplopeltura; Asthenodipsas (including Internatus); Pareas; Xylophis

= Pareidae =

Family of snakes

Pareidae is a small family of snakes found largely in southeast Asia, with an isolated subfamily endemic to southwestern India. It encompasses 42 species in four genera divided into two subfamilies: Pareinae and Xylophiinae. Both families are thought to have diverged from one another during the early-mid Eocene, about 40-50 million years ago.

Pareidae was once considered a subfamily of Colubridae (called "Pareatinae"), but since 2013 it is known that pareids are not closely related to colubrids. The correct spelling is Pareidae, not Pareatidae.

Members of the subfamily Pareinae are active, predatory snakes. Many are snail-eating snakes that have asymmetrical lower jaws, allowing them to pry the soft bodies of snails from their spiral shells. One species, Pareas iwasakii, has an average of 17.5 teeth in its left mandible and 25 teeth in its right mandible. They lack teeth on the anterior part of the maxillary. They lack a mental groove and have a blunt short head with a long thin body. The majority of species are nocturnal and arboreal. Predation by pareids on dextral (clockwise-coiled or "right handed") snails is thought to favor the evolution of sinistral (counter-clockwise or "left handed") snails in southeast Asia, where 12% of snail species are sinistral (as opposed to 5% worldwide).

The Xylophiinae have a very different lifestyle, being primarily ground-dwelling, burrowing snakes, unlike the more arboreal nature of their northern cousins.

== Genera and species ==
- Subfamily Pareinae
  - Aplopeltura (1 species)
  - Asthenodipsas (9 species)
  - Pareas (27 species)
- Subfamily Xylophiinae
  - Xylophis (5 species)
