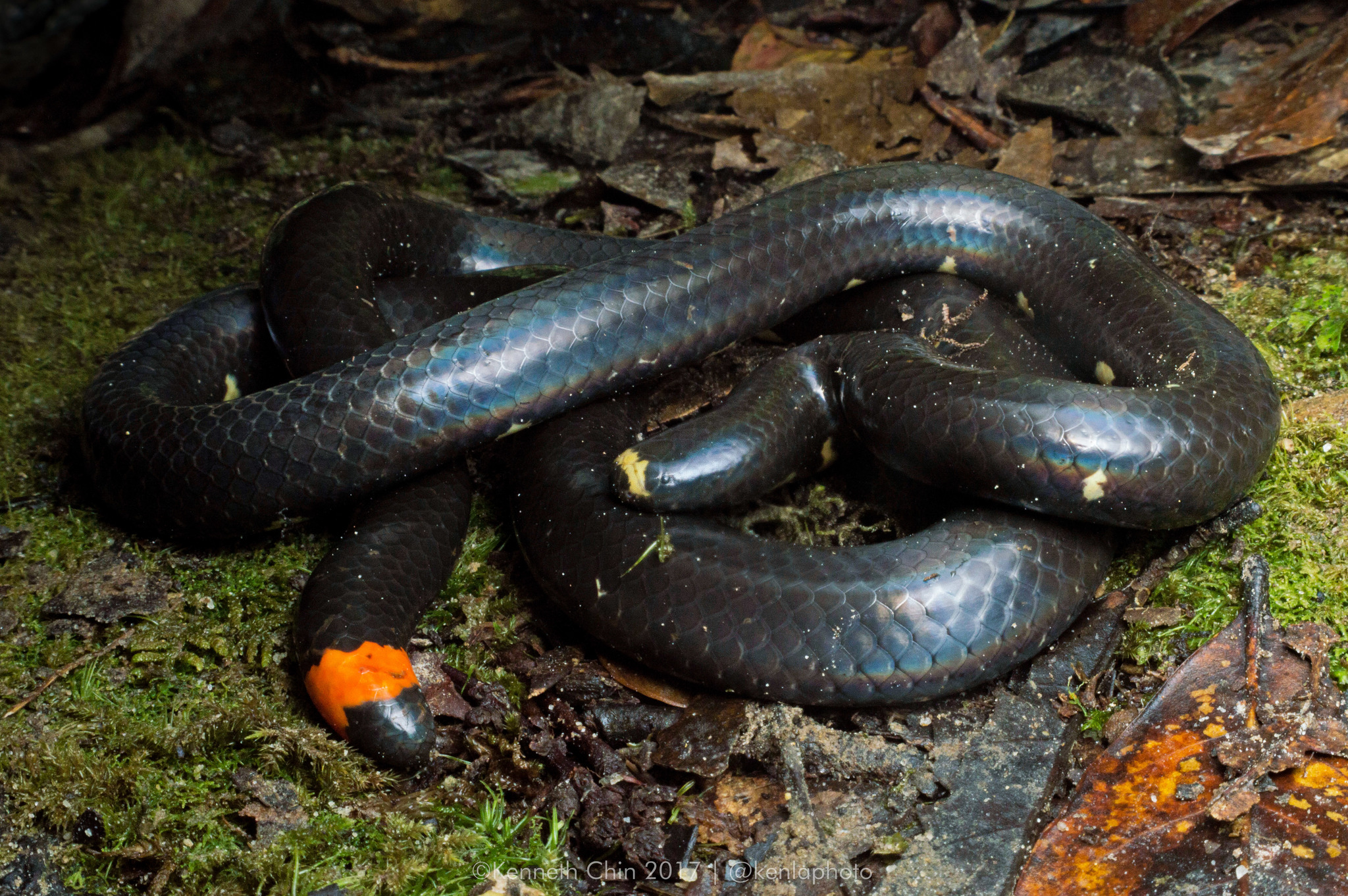

Conservation status
- Data Deficient (IUCN 3.1)

Scientific classification
- Kingdom: Animalia
- Phylum: Chordata
- Class: Reptilia
- Order: Squamata
- Suborder: Serpentes
- Family: Anomochilidae
- Genus: Anomochilus
- Species: A. monticola

Binomial name
- Anomochilus monticola Das, Lakim, Lim & Hui, 2008

= Anomochilus monticola =

Kinabalu giant blind snake

Species of snake from northern Borneo

Anomochilus monticola, the Kinabalu giant blind snake, mountain pipe snake, or Mount Kinabalu dwarf pipesnake, is a species of snake in the dwarf pipesnake family Anomochilidae. It is endemic to Kinabalu Park in northern Borneo, where it inhabits montane and submontane rainforest at altitudes of 1,450–1,513 m (4,760–4,960 ft). Described by the herpetologist Indraneil Das and colleagues in 2008, the species is a stout, cylindrical snake with a small head and short, conical tail. It is the largest species in its genus, with a total length of 521 mm (20.5 in). It is mostly iridescent blue-black in color, with a deep brown belly, large pale horn-colored blotches along the underside, a chrome orange band around the tail, a pale creamy-yellow bar across the snout, and pale horn-colored speckles along its sides. It can be told apart from the other species in its genus by its large size, the absence of a stripe along its sides, and the lack of pale blotches on its back.

The species is nocturnal and fossorial (adapted to living underground). It most likely feeds on earthworms, snakes, and legless lizards. Reproduction in the snake has not been observed, but other species in its genus lay eggs, unusually for their superfamily, where most species give birth to live young. The IUCN Red List currently classifies A. monticola as being data deficient due to a lack of information about its range and threats to the species.

== Taxonomy and systematics ==
Anomochilus monticola was first described by the herpetologist Indraneil Das and colleagues in 2008 on the basis of a female specimen collected from Kinabalu Park, Borneo, in 2004. Previously collected specimens of the species had been incorrectly identified as Cylindrophis ruffus. The specific name monticola is Latin for "inhabitant of mountains", referring to the species's type locality, Mount Kinabalu.

A. monticola is one of three species in the dwarf pipesnake genus Anomochilus, which is the only genus in the family Anomochilidae. Anomochilidae is one of three families in the superfamily Uropeltoidea, along with Uropeltidae and Cylindrophiidae. However, genetic studies indicate that Cylindrophiidae is paraphyletic (not containing all the descendants of a common ancestor) with respect to Anomochilidae, and some authorities merge the latter family into the former.

== Description ==
Like other species in its genus, A. monticola is cylindrical, with a small, rounded head and short, conical tail. It is the largest Anomochilus snake, with a snout–vent length of 507–509 mm (19.96–20.04 in) and an average total length of 521.2 mm (20.52 in). It is mostly uniformly iridescent blue-black in color across the dorsum (upper body), with a chrome orange ring around the tail and a pale creamy-yellow bar across the snout. The underside is uniformly dark brown with large pale horn-colored blotches. The blotches occur in pairs, from the throat down to the tail. The species also has smaller pale horn-colored speckles along its sides. The head is continuous with the neck and, despite the fossorial (adapted to living underground) nature of the species, the snout has no reinforcements to aid in burrowing. The dorsum is smooth, with slightly larger scales than the underside.

A. monticola has 19 rows of scales (excluding ventral scales) in the middle of the body. It has 258–261 midventral scales (scales down the middle of the underside) and 7–8 subcaudal scales (scales between the cloaca and tip of the tail). The species can be differentiated from other snakes outside of its genus by its small head and eyes, the large scales on the forehead, a single nasal scale bordering the second supralabial scale, the absence of the loreal and preocular scales, a lone postocular scale, and the lack of a mental groove.

It can be differentiated from the two other species in its genus, which both also occur on Borneo, by its significantly larger size and a combination of coloration and scalation. It differs from A. weberi in lacking pale stripes along its sides and having an unpaired parietofrontal scale on the forehead. It can be distinguished from A. leonardi by the absence of pale patches bordering the vertebral scales and the number of midventral scales (monticola has 258–261, compared to 214–252 for leonardi).

== Distribution and habitat ==
A. monticola is currently only known from Kinabalu Park in Sabah, Malaysian Borneo, where it has been recorded in submontane and montane rainforests at elevations of 1,450–1,513 m (4,760–4,960 ft). It likely inhabits both disturbed and primary forest. The two known localities from which specimens were collected were near a rocky stream and a metalled road. Like other dwarf pipesnakes, it is fossorial and is found in leaf litter.

== Ecology and conservation ==
A. monticola is nocturnal and fossorial. The ecology of the species is poorly studied, and little is known about its diet and reproductive habits. The absence of the mental groove suggests that the snake feeds on elongate invertebrates like earthworms and perhaps on small, slim vertebrates like snakes and legless lizards. Reproduction in the species has not been studied, but other Anomochilus are known to lay eggs, unlike the rest of the Uropeltoidea, which give birth to live young.

The species is currently classified as being data deficient by the International Union for Conservation of Nature due to a lack of information about its range and threats affecting it. Its known range falls entirely with the protected Kinabalu Park.
