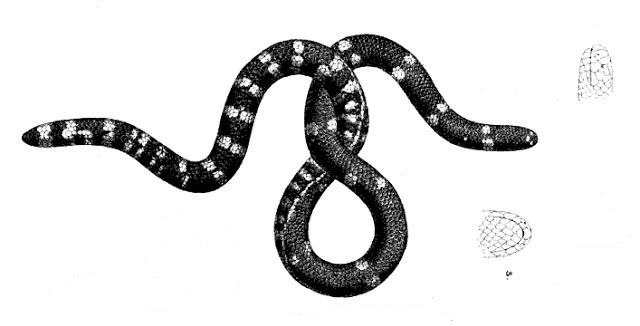
- Sketch of A. weberi from 1890

Conservation status
- Data Deficient (IUCN 3.1)

Scientific classification
- Kingdom: Animalia
- Phylum: Chordata
- Class: Reptilia
- Order: Squamata
- Suborder: Serpentes
- Family: Anomochilidae
- Genus: Anomochilus
- Species: A. weberi

Binomial name
- Anomochilus weberi (Lidth de Jeude in Weber, 1890)

Synonyms
- Anomalochilus weberi Lidth de Jeude in Weber, 1890

= Anomochilus weberi =

Species of snake

Anomochilus weberi, commonly known as Weber's dwarf pipesnake or the Sumatran giant blind snake, is a species of snake in the dwarf pipesnake family Anomochilidae. It is endemic to the islands of Borneo and Sumatra, where it inhabits montane and lowland dipterocarp forest at altitudes of 300–1,000 m (980–3,280 ft). Described by the herpetologist Theodorus Willem van Lidth de Jeude in 1890, the species is a stout, cylindrical snake with a small head and short, conical tail. It is the smallest species in its genus, with a total length of 230 mm (9.1 in). It is mostly black in color, with pale stripes along its sides and pale blotches bordering the vertebral scales, as well as a variety of other pale spots and markings on the tail and head. It can be told apart from the other species in its genus by its small size, the presence of a pale stripe along its sides, and the presence of pale blotches along its back.

The species is nocturnal and fossorial (adapted to living underground). It most likely feeds on earthworms, snakes, and legless lizards. The species lays eggs in clutches of four, unusually for its superfamily, where most species give birth to live young. The IUCN Red List currently classifies A. weberi as being data deficient due to a lack of information about its range and threats to the species; however, it may be threatened by habitat loss caused by logging and urbanisation.

== Taxonomy and systematics ==
In 1890, the Dutch herpetologist Theodorus van Lidth de Jeude described the species Anomalochilus weberi on the basis of a female specimen of the species from Sumatra. He also described the genus Anomalochilus in the same paper, creating it for the species. In 1901, the naturalist Charles Berg renamed the genus to Anomochilus, as the name Anomalochilus was already in use for a genus of beetles. The specific name, weberi, is in honor of German-Dutch zoologist Max Wilhelm Carl Weber van Bosse.

A. weberi is one of three species in the dwarf pipesnake genus Anomochilus, which is the only genus in the family Anomochilidae. Anomochilidae is one of three families in the superfamily Uropeltoidea, along with Uropeltidae and Cylindrophiidae. However, genetic studies indicate that Cylindrophiidae is paraphyletic (not containing all the descendants of a common ancestor) with respect to Anomochilidae, and some authorities merge Anomochilidae into Cylindrophiidae.

== Description ==
Like other species in its genus, A. weberi is cylindrical with a small, rounded head and short, conical tail. It is the smallest Anomochilus snake, with a total length of 230 mm (9.1 in). The head is continuous with the neck, and, despite the fossorial (adapted to living underground) nature of the species, the snout has no reinforcements to aid in burrowing. The dorsum is smooth, with slightly larger scales than the underside. The species also completely lacks the left lung. It has a completely black underside and a black upperside with pale stripes along its sides and pale blotches bordering the vertebral scales. The prefrontal scales and anal scales are whitish, and the underside of the tail has a whitish band that forms a half-ring around the tail. The undersides have two rows of irregular white spots and the very tip of the tail also has two small pale spots. When preserved in alcohol, the species' color changes to mainly brown.

A. weberi has 19 rows of scales (excluding ventral scales) in the middle of the body. It has 242–248 midventral scales (scales down the middle of the underside) and 6–8 subcaudal scales (scales between the cloaca and tip of the tail). The species can be differentiated from other snakes outside of its genus by its small head and eyes, the large scales on the forehead, a single nasal scale bordering the second supralabial scale, the absence of the loreal and preocular scales, a lone postocular scale, and the lack of a mental groove.

The species is the only Anomochilus on Sumatra, but co-occurs with both of its congeners on Borneo. It differs from both A. monticola and A. leonardi by the presence of pale stripes along its sides and a paired parietofrontal scale on the forehead.

== Distribution and habitat ==
A. weberi is currently only known from the Greater Sunda Islands in the Indonesian Archipelago, where it occurs on Sumatra and Borneo. On Borneo, it is found near Kutai, Kalimantan; on Sumatra, it is known from the Padang Highlands and Mount Talakmau in western Sumatra. It is thought to inhabit montane and lowland dipterocarp forests at altitudes of 300–1,000 m (980–3,280 ft), and like other species in its genus, is fossorial.

== Ecology and conservation ==
A. weberi is nocturnal and fossorial. The ecology of the species is poorly studied, and little is known about its diet and reproductive habits. The absence of the mental groove suggests that the snake feeds on elongate invertebrates like earthworms and perhaps on small, slim vertebrates like other snakes and legless lizards. The species lays eggs in clutches of four; this is unique within the superfamily Uropeltoidea, the rest of which give birth to live young.

The species is currently classified as being data deficient by the International Union for Conservation of Nature due to a lack of information about its range, population size, and threats affecting it. It may be threatened by habitat loss caused by logging and urbanisation.
