= Anomochilus leonardi =

Conservation status
- Least Concern (IUCN 3.1)

Scientific classification
- Kingdom: Animalia
- Phylum: Chordata
- Class: Reptilia
- Order: Squamata
- Suborder: Serpentes
- Family: Anomochilidae
- Genus: Anomochilus
- Species: A. leonardi

Binomial name
- Anomochilus leonardi M. A. Smith, 1940
- Anomochilus leonardi range in Malaysia

Species of snake

Anomochilus leonardi, also known by the common names Leonard's pipe snake, Leonard's burrowing snake, and Malayan giant blind snake, is a species of snake in the dwarf pipesnake family Anomochilidae. The species is native to the Malay Peninsula and Borneo, where it inhabits primary and mature secondary dipterocarp forests at altitudes of 250–500 m (820–1,640 ft). Described by British herpetologist Malcolm Arthur Smith in 1940, the species is a stout, cylindrical snake with a small head and short, conical tail. It has a snout–vent length of up to 390 mm (15 in), a glossy black to purplish upperside, and a black underside. It also has two rows of elliptical yellow spots along the back, a yellow bar across the snout, and a large red patch on the subcaudal scales. It can be told apart from the other species in its genus by the absence of pale stripes along its sides, an unpaired parietofrontal scale, and the presence of the pale patches along its back.

The species is nocturnal and fossorial (adapted to living underground). It most likely feeds on earthworms, snakes, and legless lizards. Reproduction in the snake has not been observed, but other species in its genus lay eggs, unusually for its superfamily Uropeltoidea, in which most species give birth to live young. The IUCN Red List currently classifies the species as being of least concern due to its presence in protected areas and the fact that its range is likely larger than currently known.

== Taxonomy and systematics ==
A. leonardi was described by the British herpetologist Malcolm Arthur Smith in 1940 based on two female specimens collected near the town of Merapoh in Pahang, Malaysia. The specific name leonardi is in honor of G. R. Leonard, collector of the holotype.

A. leonardi is one of three species in the dwarf pipesnake genus Anomochilus, which is the only genus in the family Anomochilidae. Anomochilidae is one of three families in the superfamily Uropeltoidea, along with Uropeltidae and Cylindrophiidae. However, genetic studies indicate that Cylindrophiidae is paraphyletic (not containing all the descendants of a common ancestor) with respect to Anomochilidae, and some authorities merge the latter family into the former.

== Description ==
Like other species in its genus, A. leonardi is cylindrical, with a small, rounded head and short, conical tail. It has a snout–vent length of up to 390 mm (15 in). The upper side of the body is glossy black to purplish-brown, while the underside is black. The back has two rows of elliptical yellow spots along the sides of vertebral scales, and there is a yellow bar across the snout and a large red patch on the subcaudal scales. The head is continuous with the neck and, despite the fossorial (adapted to living underground) nature of the species, the snout has no reinforcements to aid in burrowing. The dorsum is smooth, with slightly larger scales than the underside.

A. leonardi has 17 or 19 rows of scales (excluding ventral scales) in the middle of the body. It has 214–252 midventral scales (scales down the middle of the underside) and 6–7 subcaudal scales (scales between the cloaca and tip of the tail). The species can be differentiated from other snakes outside of its genus by its small head and eyes, the large scales on the forehead, a single nasal scale bordering the second supralabial scale, the absence of the loreal and preocular scales, a lone postocular scale, and the lack of a mental groove.

The species is the only Anomochilus on the Malay Peninsula, but co-occurs with both of its congeners on Borneo. It differs from A. weberi in lacking pale stripes along its sides and having an unpaired parietofrontal scale on the forehead. It can be distinguished from A. monticola by the presence of pale patches bordering the vertebral scales and the number of midventral scales (monticola has 258–261, compared to 214–252 for leonardi).

== Distribution and habitat ==
A. leonardi is currently only known from Sundaland, where it occurs on Borneo and the Malay Peninsula. In Peninsular Malaysia, it is found near Merapoh in Pahang and Ulu Gombak and Kepong in Selangor; on Borneo, it is known from Sepilok in Sabah. The actual range of the species is probably larger than currently thought. It inhabits primary and mature secondary dipterocarp forests in plains and hills, usually at altitudes of around 250 m (820 ft), although some specimens have been collected from as high as 500 m (1,600 ft). It is mostly known from riparian areas near streams and rivers, and the species, like others in its genus, is fossorial.

== Ecology and conservation ==
A. leonardi is nocturnal and fossorial. The ecology of the species is poorly studied, and little is known about its diet and reproductive habits. The absence of the mental groove suggests that the snake feeds on elongate invertebrates like earthworms and perhaps on small, slim vertebrates like snakes and legless lizards. Reproduction in the species has not been studied, but other Anomochilus are known to lay eggs, unlike the rest of the Uropeltoidea, which give birth to live young.

The species is currently classified as being of least concern by the International Union for Conservation of Nature as it is known to inhabit nature reserves and its range is likely larger than currently known. It is known from the protected areas of Ulu Gombak Forest Reserve and Taman Negara National Park.
