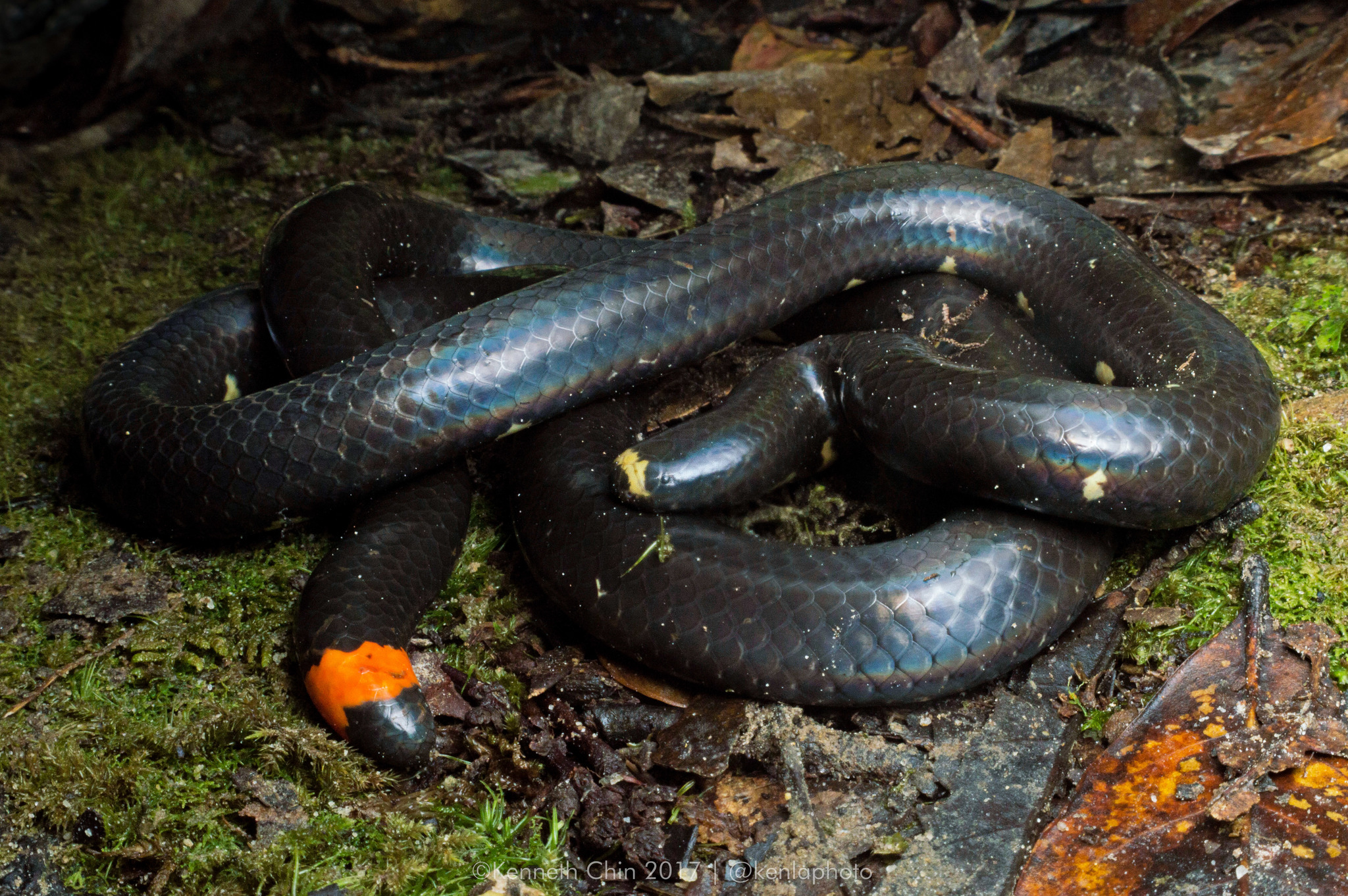
- Anomochilus monticola

Scientific classification
- Kingdom: Animalia
- Phylum: Chordata
- Class: Reptilia
- Order: Squamata
- Suborder: Serpentes
- Infraorder: Alethinophidia
- Superfamily: Uropeltoidea
- Family: Anomochilidae; Cundall, Wallach & Rossman, 1993
- Genus: Anomochilus; Berg, 1901

Type species
- Anomalochilus weberi Lidth de Jeude, 1890

Species
- A. leonardi M. A. Smith, 1940; A. monticola Das, Lakim, Lim & Hui, 2008; A. weberi Lidth de Jeude, 1890

Synonyms
- Anomalochilus Lidth de Jeude in Weber, 1890

= Anomochilus =

Genus of reptiles from Southeast Asia

Anomochilidae is a family of snakes with one genus, Anomochilus, containing three species of snake. Members of the genus are known as anomochilids, or by the common names dwarf pipesnakes, lesser pipesnakes, and giant blind snakes. Initially created as Anomalochilus in 1890 for the species A. weberi, the genus was renamed in 1901 because the original name was already in use for a genus of beetles. Dwarf pipesnakes are small and cylindrical, with short, conical tails and small, rounded heads that are continuous with the neck. They have blackish to purplish-brown uppersides and dark brown or black undersides, with orange-red bands around the tail and a variety of pale markings on the snout and belly. All three species of dwarf pipesnake are endemic to Sundaland, where they are found on the Malay Peninsula and the islands of Sumatra and Borneo.

Adapted to living underground, dwarf pipesnakes inhabit leaf litter in lowland and montane rainforests at elevations of 220–1,513 m (722–4,964 ft). They are poorly studied and little is known about their diets and reproductive habits. They probably feed on earthworms, snakes, and legless lizards, and uniquely within their superfamily, lay eggs to give birth. Two species of dwarf pipesnake, A. weberi and monticola, are classified as being Data Deficient by the IUCN, while the third species, A. leonardi, is classified as being of Least Concern.

== Taxonomy and systematics ==
The genus Anomochilus (Note: From the Ancient Greek words meaning "abnormal lip".) was erected by the Dutch herpetologist Theodorus Willem van Lidth de Jeude in 1890 as Anomalochilus for the species Anomalochilus weberi, which he described on the basis of a female specimen from Sumatra. In 1901, the naturalist Charles Berg renamed the genus to Anomochilus, as the name Anomalochilus was already in use for a genus of beetles. A second species of the genus, A. leonardi, was described by the British herpetologist Malcolm Arthur Smith in 1940 from two specimens collected in Pahang, Malaysia. The third species in the genus, A. monticola, was described by the Indian herpetologist Indraneil Das and colleagues in 2008, based on specimens collected from Mount Kinabalu on Borneo.

Anomochilus was initially described in the family "Tortriciidae", (Note: The name Tortricidae is currently used to refer to a family of moths.) which was later synonymized with the family Cylindrophiidae. Subsequently, it was moved to Aniliidae, before being placed in Uropeltidae by the American herpetologist Samuel Booker McDowell Jr. in 1975. In 1993, the American herpetologist David Cundall and colleagues split the Uropeltidae into three families, reinstating Cylindrophiidae and moving Anomochilus into its own monogeneric family, Anomochilidae. Subsequent genetic studies have shown that Cylindrophiidae is likely paraphyletic (not containing all the descendants of a common ancestor) with respect to Anomochilidae, and a 2022 study recommended placing Anomochilus back in the former family.

Anomochilus contains three species of pipesnake. All three species are known to live on the island of Borneo, which is presumed to be the center of diversification for the genus. The genus is closely related to the family Cylindrophiidae, which it is sometimes placed in, and these two form a clade most closely related to the Uropeltidae. The following cladogram shows phylogenetic relationships of Anomochiliidae with other families, based on the 2022 study:

- - - - Cylindrophiidae
      - Uropeltidae (including Anomochilidae)
    - - - - Xenopeltidae
          - - Loxocemidae
            - Pythonidae
        - - Xenophidiidae
          - Boidae

== Description ==
Dwarf pipesnakes are small and cylindrical snakes, with a small, rounded head and short, conical tail. The head is continuous with the neck and, despite the fossorial nature of the species, the snout has no reinforcements to aid in burrowing. The uppersides are usually uniform blackish to purplish-brown and the undersides are dark brown or black, the latter frequently being marked by yellow or white blotches. The snout has yellow markings and the tail is bounded by an orange or red band.

They can be differentiated from other snakes outside of the genus by their small head and eyes, the large scales on the forehead, a single nasal scale bordering the second supralabial scale, the absence of the loreal and preocular scales, a lone postocular scale, and the lack of a mental groove. Additionally, the dentition of dwarf pipesnakes is unique among snakes: members of the family have no teeth on the pterygoid and palatine bones, and only four diagonally oriented maxillary teeth.

Morphological characteristics of dwarf pipesnakes

Based on Das and colleagues (2008) and Das (2010).

Conventions: SVL=Snout–vent length, TL=Total length

Image	Scientific and common name	Length	Coloration	Scalation
	A. leonardi (Malayan giant blind snake or Leonard's dwarf pipesnake)	228 mm (9.0 in) (TL)	no pale stripes along sides; large pale spots along the vertebral column; glossy black to purplish-brown upperside; black belly and red subcaudal scales	214–252 ventral scales; single, unpaired parietofrontal scale
	A. monticola (Kinabalu giant blind snake or Mount Kinabalu dwarf pipesnake)	507–509 mm (20.0–20.0 in) (SVL), 521.2 mm (20.52 in) (TL)	no pale stripes along sides or spots along the vertebral column; solitary pale yellow scales along sides; glossy blue-black upperside; dark brown belly	258–261 ventral scales; single, unpaired parietofrontal scale
	A. weberi (Sumatran giant blind snake or Weber's dwarf pipesnake)	228 mm (9.0 in) (TL)	pale stripes along sides with large pale spots along the vertebral column; black uppersides and belly	242–248 ventral scales; paired parietofrontal scale

== Distribution and habitat ==
All three species of dwarf pipesnake are endemic to Sundaland, where they are found on the Malay Peninsula and the islands of Sumatra and Borneo. A. leonardi inhabits the Malay Peninsula and Sabah in Malaysian Borneo, while A. weberi is found on Sumatra and Kalimantan on Borneo. A. monticola is currently known only from Kinabalu Park in Sabah. Dwarf pipesnakes are fossorial and inhabit leaf litter in lowland and montane rainforests, frequently near creeks. A. leonardi inhabits plains and low hill forest at elevations of 220–500 m (720–1,640 ft), A. monticola inhabits montane forest at elevations of 1,450–1,513 m (4,757–4,964 ft), and A. weberi inhabits montane forest at elevations of 300–1,000 m (980–3,280 ft).

== Ecology and behaviour ==
Dwarf pipesnakes are fossorial (adapted to living underground). Their ecology is poorly studied and little is known about their diets and reproductive habits. Their small mouths, truncated quadrate bones (the length of which allows other snakes to swallow large prey), and lack of the mental groove (which enables other species to expand their lower jaw) suggests that their diet consists of elongate invertebrates like earthworms and perhaps also of small, slim vertebrates like snakes and legless lizards. A. weberi is known to lay clutches of four eggs, but reproduction in the other species is undescribed. Dwarf pipesnakes are the only uropeltoids that lay eggs; all other uropeltoids give birth to live young.

== Status ==
Two species of dwarf pipesnake, A. weberi and monticola, are classified as being Data Deficient by the IUCN, while the third species, A. leonardi, is classified as being of Least Concern. All three species are known from a very small number of specimens and consequently do not have population estimates or well-defined ranges. A. monticola and leonardi are known from the protected areas of Kinabalu Park and Taman Negara, respectively. Little is known about threats facing the genus, although A. weberi is thought to be threatened by habitat loss caused by logging and urbanisation.
