= Parietals =

Parietals may refer to:

- A reptilian diagnostic term, see parietal scales.
- Parietal cells, stomach epithelium cells that secrete gastric acid and intrinsic factor to aid in digestion.
- The parietal bone.
