= Slowinski =

Slowinski or Słowiński is a surname. Notable people with the surname include:

- David Slowinski, American mathematician
- Edward Slowinski (1922–1999), Canadian ice hockey player
- Joseph Bruno Slowinski (1962–2001), American herpetologist
- Paul Slowinski (born 1980), Polish-Australian kickboxer
- Roman Słowiński (born 1952), Polish computer scientist
- Sebastian Słowiński (born 1998), Polish poet and minority rights activist
- Władysław Słowiński (1930–2024), Polish composer and conductor

== See also ==
- Slowinski's corn snake, a subspecies
- Slowinski’s pipe snake, a species
