= Highland moccasin =

Highland moccasin may refer to:

- Agkistrodon contortrix, a.k.a. the copperhead, a venomous pitviper species found in North America
- Agkistrodon piscivorus, a.k.a. the cottonmouth, a venomous pitviper species found in the eastern United States
