= Leucolysin =

Identifiers
- EC no.: 3.4.24.6
- CAS no.: 72561-03-6

Databases
- IntEnz: IntEnz view
- BRENDA: BRENDA entry
- ExPASy: NiceZyme view
- KEGG: KEGG entry
- MetaCyc: metabolic pathway
- PRIAM: profile
- PDB structures: RCSB PDB PDBe PDBsum
Search
- PMC: articles
- PubMed: articles
- NCBI: proteins

Leucolysin (EC 3.4.24.6, Leucostoma neutral proteinase, Leucostoma peptidase A) is an enzyme. This enzyme catalyses the following chemical reaction

Cleavage of Phe^{1}-Val, His^{5}-Leu, Ala^{14}-Leu, Gly^{20}-Glu, Gly^{23}-Phe and Phe^{24}-Phe bonds in insulin B chain as well as N-blocked dipeptides

This enzyme is isolated from the venom of the western cottonmouth moccasin snake (Agkistrodon piscivorus leucostoma).
