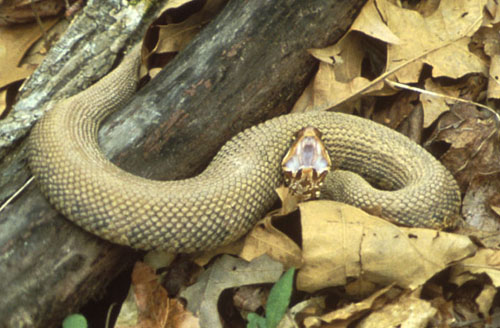

Scientific classification
- Kingdom: Animalia
- Phylum: Chordata
- Class: Reptilia
- Order: Squamata
- Suborder: Serpentes
- Family: Viperidae
- Genus: Agkistrodon
- Species: A. piscivorus
- Subspecies: A. p. piscivorus

Trinomial name
- Agkistrodon piscivorus piscivorus (Lacépède, 1789)
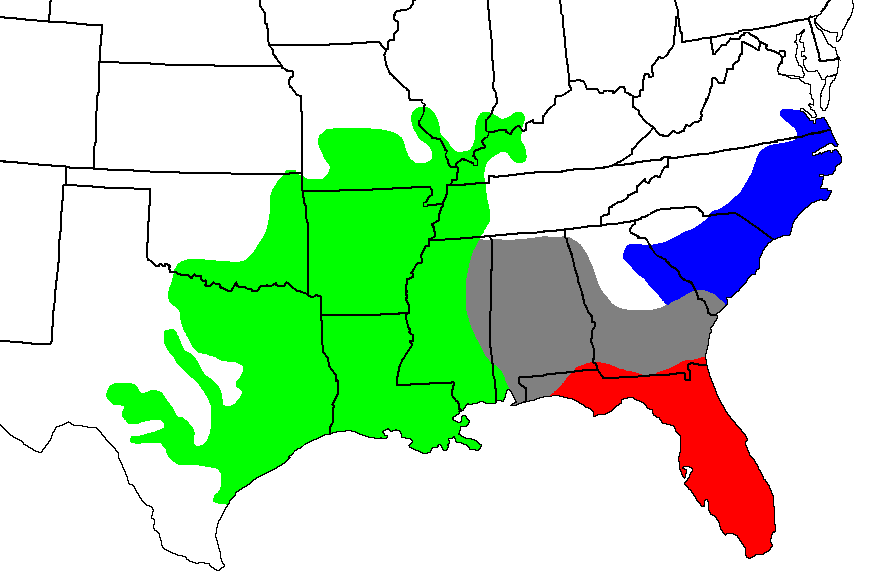
- Geographic variation of A. piscivorus A. p. piscivorus Intergradation

Synonyms
- Crotalus piscivorus – Lacépède, 1789; Trigonocephalus piscivorus – Duméeril & Bibron, 1854; Ancistrodon piscivorus – Cope, 1860; Toxicophis piscivorus – Baird & Girard, 1853; Agkistrodon piscivorus piscivorus – Conant & Collins, 1991

= Agkistrodon piscivorus piscivorus =

Eastern cottonmouth

Subspecies of snake

Common names: Eastern cottonmouth, cottonmouth moccasin, water moccasin, moccasin

Agkistrodon piscivorus piscivorus was previously identified as one of three subspecies of Agkistrodon piscivorus, with different geographic distributions, found in the Southeastern United States. However, recent taxonomic changes do not recognize any subspecies of cottonmouth (Agkistrodon piscivorus) as a valid taxa.

== New Taxonomy ==
The eastern cottonmouth (Agkistrodon piscivorus piscivorus) was once classified as a subspecies of the cottonmouth (Agkistrodon piscivorus). However, DNA based studies published in 2008 and 2015, revealed no significant genetic difference between the eastern cottonmouth (Agkistrodon piscivorus piscivorus) and the western cottonmouth (Agkistrodon piscivorus leucostoma) and synonymized the two subspecies (with the oldest published name, A. piscivorus, having priority). The resulting taxonomy does not recognizes the eastern cottonmouth (A. p. piscivorus) as a valid taxon. Several subsequent reviews and species accounts have followed and supported the revised taxonomy. Information on this snake can be found in the Agkistrodon piscivorus article.

== Description ==
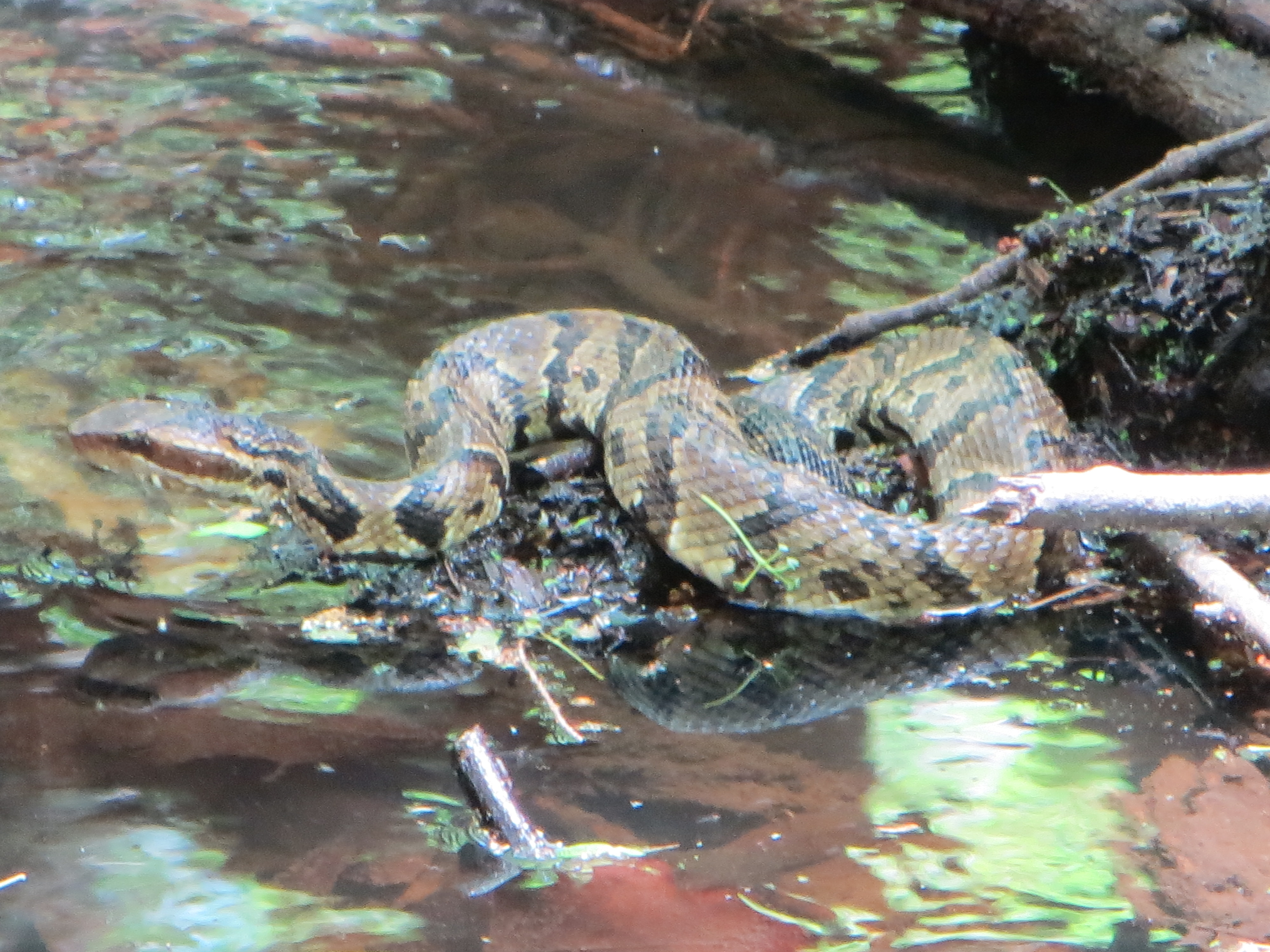

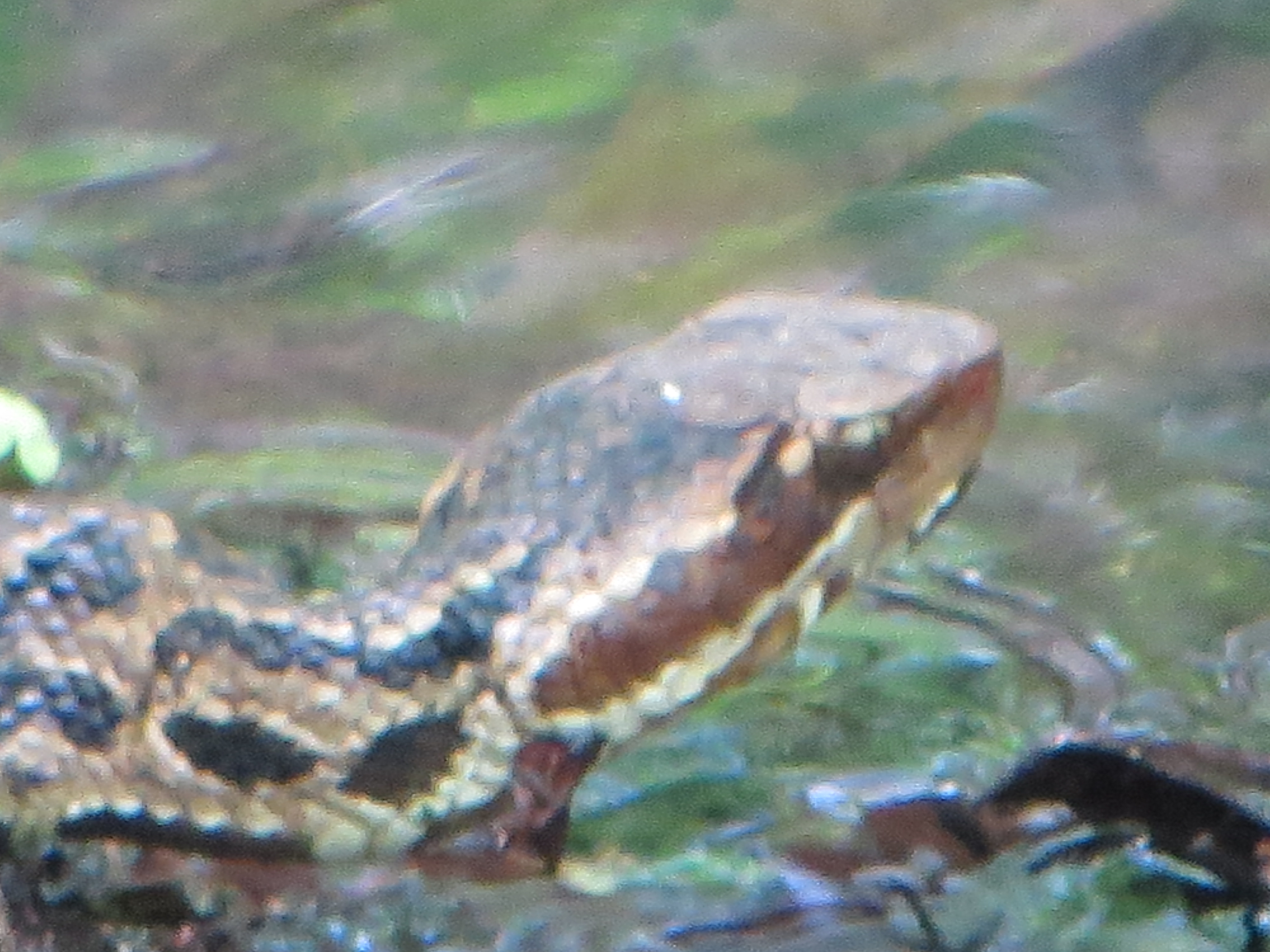
Patterning on a younger specimen

This subspecies reaches 20–48 inches (51–121 cm) in length on average but has reached 74.5 inches (189 cm). The colour is mainly dark, and the body heavy. However younger specimens have red to brown crossbands, with a lighter brown background. The crossbands are spotted and speckled, and the tail sulphur coloured. The patterning darkens with time with many older adults being completely black.

The scales are keeled and dark broad stripes on the face disguise the eyes, which cannot be seen when viewed from above, and have a vertical (cat's-eye) slit like pupil. The eye is separated from the nostril by a deep facial pit.

== Geographic range ==
The United States in southeastern Virginia, the Atlantic Coastal Plain and lower Piedmont of North and South Carolina, including the banks, peninsulas and islands along the Atlantic coast, and west across Georgia (see map).

== Sources ==
- Florida Museum of Natural History: Eastern Cottonmouth
