= Blanford's pipe snake =

Conservation status
- Data Deficient (IUCN 3.1)

Scientific classification
- Kingdom: Animalia
- Phylum: Chordata
- Class: Reptilia
- Order: Squamata
- Suborder: Serpentes
- Family: Cylindrophiidae
- Genus: Cylindrophis
- Species: C. lineatus

Binomial name
- Cylindrophis lineatus Dennys, 1880

Species of snake

Blanford's pipe snake or lined pipe snake, (Cylindrophis lineatus) is a species of snake in the family Cylindrophiidae endemic to Indonesia.

== Description ==
A blackish-brown stripe, three scales wide, runs down the middle of the back from head to tail, and is bordered on each side by a narrower white stripe; below this again is a second, broad, blackish stripe of irregular width, with the lower border wavy. This stripe is separated by a narrow, wavy, white stripe from the dark crossbands of the belly, which are narrower than the alternating white crossbands. As in other species of this genus, the crossbands on opposite sides of the belly do not precisely coincide. The head and tail are yellowish white, with a few blackish spots. The type specimen is 25 in (63.5 cm) in total length, of which the tail is only 0.8 inch (2 cm).

Dorsal scales occur in 21 rows, and ventrals in 215, nearly twice as large as contiguous dorsal scales; the anal scale is divided; it has 9 subcaudals.
