= Boulenger's pipe snake =

Conservation status
- Data Deficient (IUCN 3.1)

Scientific classification
- Kingdom: Animalia
- Phylum: Chordata
- Class: Reptilia
- Order: Squamata
- Suborder: Serpentes
- Family: Cylindrophiidae
- Genus: Cylindrophis
- Species: C. boulengeri

Binomial name
- Cylindrophis boulengeri Roux, 1911

Species of snake

Boulenger's pipe snake (Cylindrophis boulengeri) is a species of nonvenomous snake in the family Cylindrophiidae. The species is endemic to Indonesia.

== Etymology ==
The specific epithet, boulengeri, is in honor of Belgian-British herpetologist George Albert Boulenger.

== Geographic range ==
Within Indonesia C. boulengeri is found on the Babar Islands, Timor, and Wetar.

== Description ==
C. boulengeri may attain a total length (including tail) of 55 cm (22 in). Dorsally, it is black; ventrally, it has alternating dark gray and yellowish crossbands.

== Reproduction ==
C. boulengeri is viviparous.
