= Jampea Island pipe snake =

Conservation status
- Critically Endangered (IUCN 3.1)

Scientific classification
- Kingdom: Animalia
- Phylum: Chordata
- Class: Reptilia
- Order: Squamata
- Suborder: Serpentes
- Family: Cylindrophiidae
- Genus: Cylindrophis
- Species: C. isolepis

Binomial name
- Cylindrophis isolepis Boulenger, 1896

Species of snake

The Jampea Island pipe snake (Cylindrophis isolepis) is a species of snake in the Cylindrophiidae family endemic to Tanah Jampea, Indonesia. The specific epithet, isolepis, meaning "equal scale", refers to the fact that in this species, the ventral scales are the same as the dorsal scales.

== Description ==
Dorsally, it is black, and each scale has a fine whitish edge. Ventrally, two alternating series of large white blotches are found. The lower surface of the tail is orange.

It has six upper labials, with the third and fourth entering the eye, and no enlarged ventrals; 22 rows of scales occur around the body, with five subcaudals.

The type specimen measures 43 cm (17 in) in total length.
