= Cylindrophis burmanus =

Scientific classification
- Kingdom: Animalia
- Phylum: Chordata
- Class: Reptilia
- Order: Squamata
- Suborder: Serpentes
- Family: Cylindrophiidae
- Genus: Cylindrophis
- Species: C. burmanus

Binomial name
- Cylindrophis burmanus Smith, 1943

Species of snake

Cylindrophis burmanus, the Burmese pipe snake, is a species of snake of the family Cylindrophiidae.

The snake is found in Myanmar.
