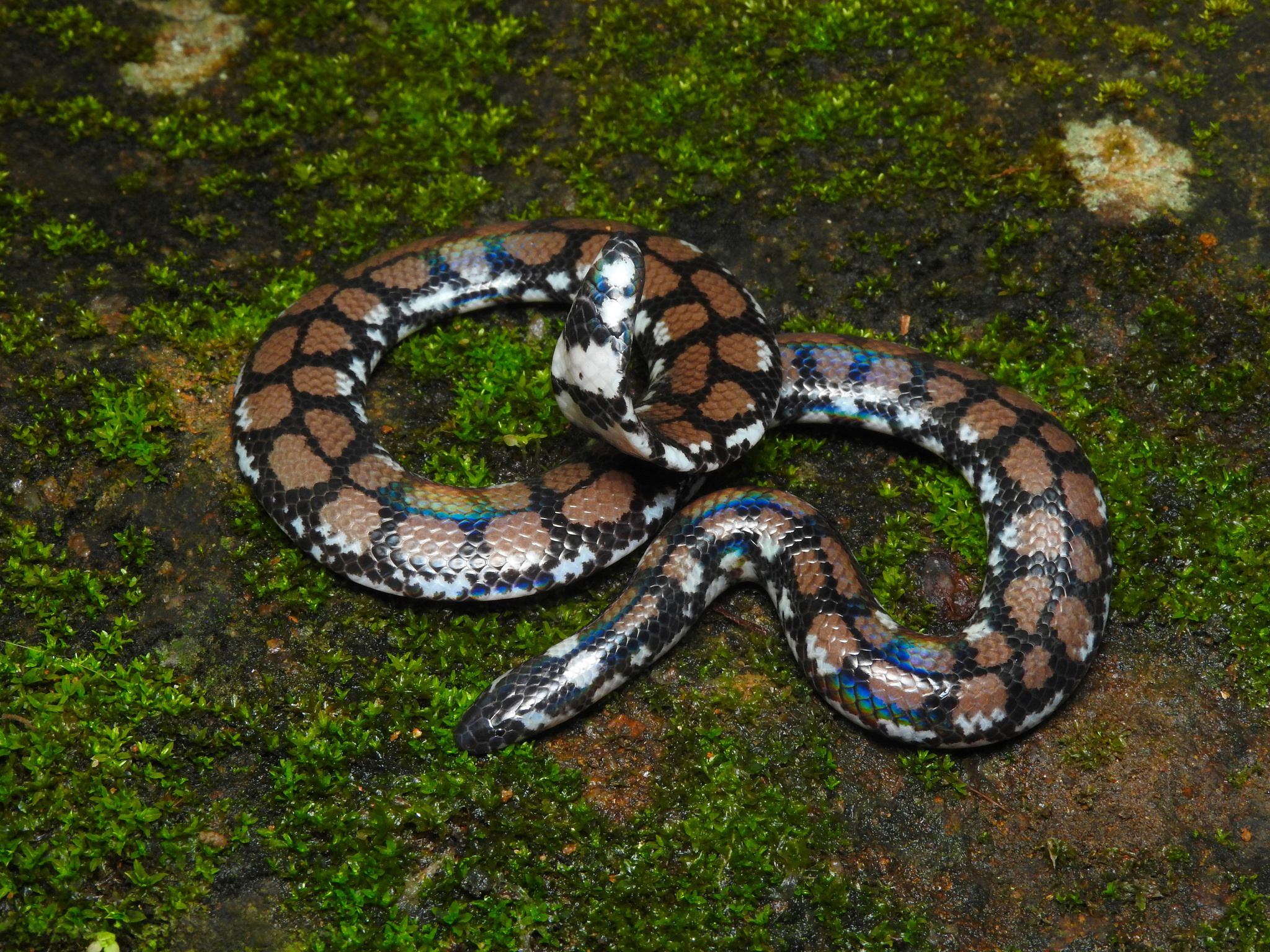

Conservation status
- Vulnerable (IUCN 3.1)

Scientific classification
- Kingdom: Animalia
- Phylum: Chordata
- Class: Reptilia
- Order: Squamata
- Suborder: Serpentes
- Family: Cylindrophiidae
- Genus: Cylindrophis
- Species: C. maculatus

Binomial name
- Cylindrophis maculatus (Linnaeus, 1758)

Synonyms
- Anguis maculata Linnaeus, 1758

= Ceylonese cylinder snake =

Species of snake

The Ceylonese cylinder snake (Cylindrophis maculatus) is a species of snake in the family Cylindrophiidae endemic to Sri Lanka. It is known from plains up to 1000m, localities include Gampola, Peradeniya, Kandy, Pallekele, and Elahera in the central hills and Nikaweratiya in the north-western part of the island.

Known as දෙපත් නයා (depath naya) and වටඋල්ලා (wataulla) in Sinhala, it is the first reptile discovered and documented by Sri Lanka. Its defense response consists of flattening posterior half of the body and curling posterior quarter of the body and tail forwards, with head usually concealed under body during this display.

== Description ==
C. maculatus has two series of large reddish-brown spots along the back, which are enclosed by a black network. The belly is white, variegated with black.

The dorsal scales are smooth, arranged in 19 or 21 rows. Ventrals number 189-212, and are almost twice as large as the contiguous dorsal scales; the anal scale is divided; the subcaudals number 4-6.

Adults may reach 35 cm (14 in) in total length.

== Ecology ==
A sub-fossorial, nocturnal snake, it rests under stones, decaying logs, amongst rocks and in leaf litter by day, emerging at night to feed on other snakes such as Dumeril's kukri snake, Boie's rough-sided snake, Trevelyan's earth snake, Gunther's rough-sided snake. Earthworms and insects have also been recorded in the diet.

== Reproduction ==
Ovoviviparous. Producing 1-15 live young at a time, measuring 105-191mm.
