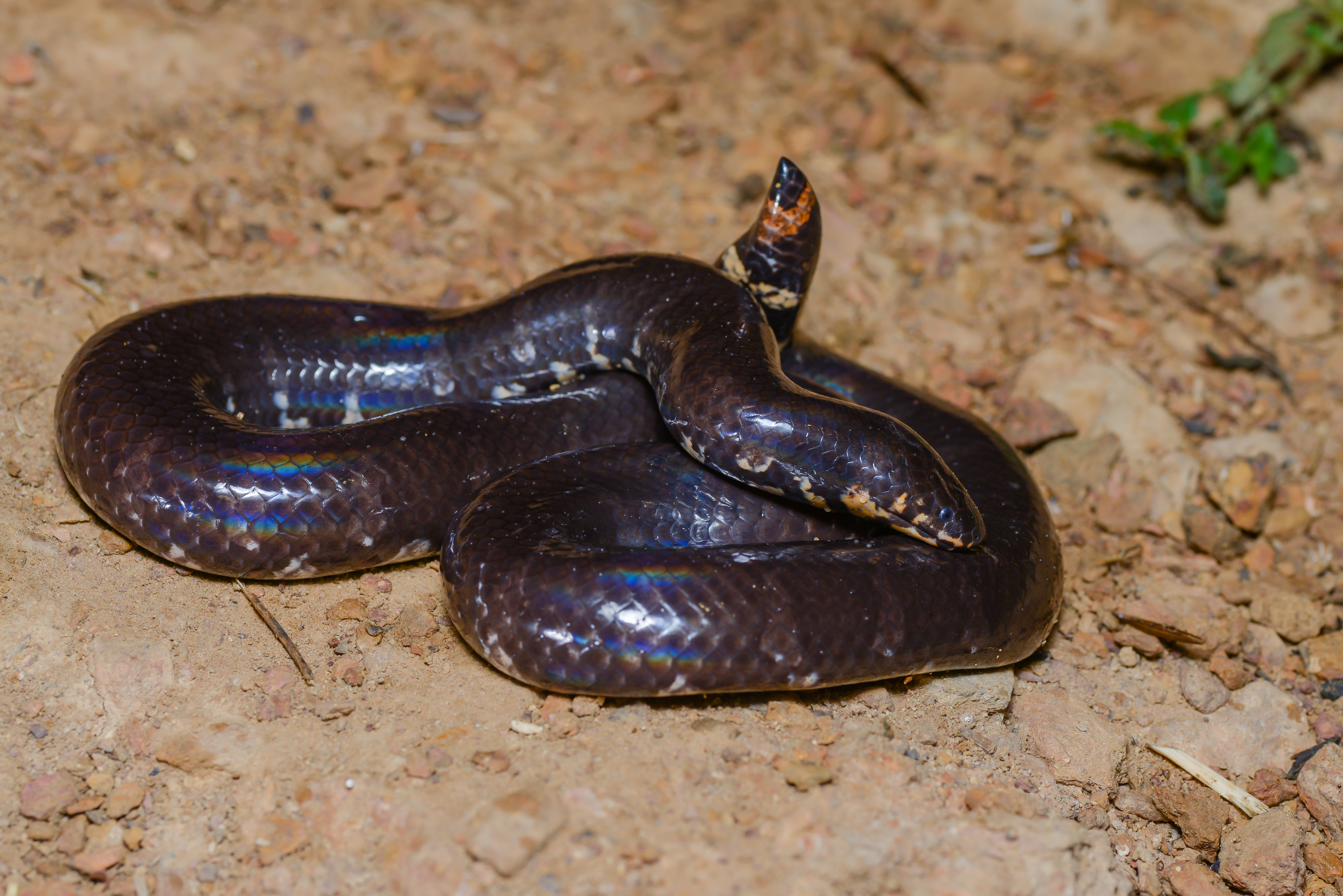

Scientific classification
- Kingdom: Animalia
- Phylum: Chordata
- Class: Reptilia
- Order: Squamata
- Suborder: Serpentes
- Family: Cylindrophiidae
- Genus: Cylindrophis
- Species: C. jodiae

Binomial name
- Cylindrophis jodiae Amarasinghe, Ineich, Campbell, & Hallermann, 2015

= Cylindrophis jodiae =

Species of snake

Cylindrophis jodiae, Jodi’s pipe snake, is a species of snake of the family Cylindrophiidae.

The snake is found in Thailand, Cambodia, Vietnam and China.
