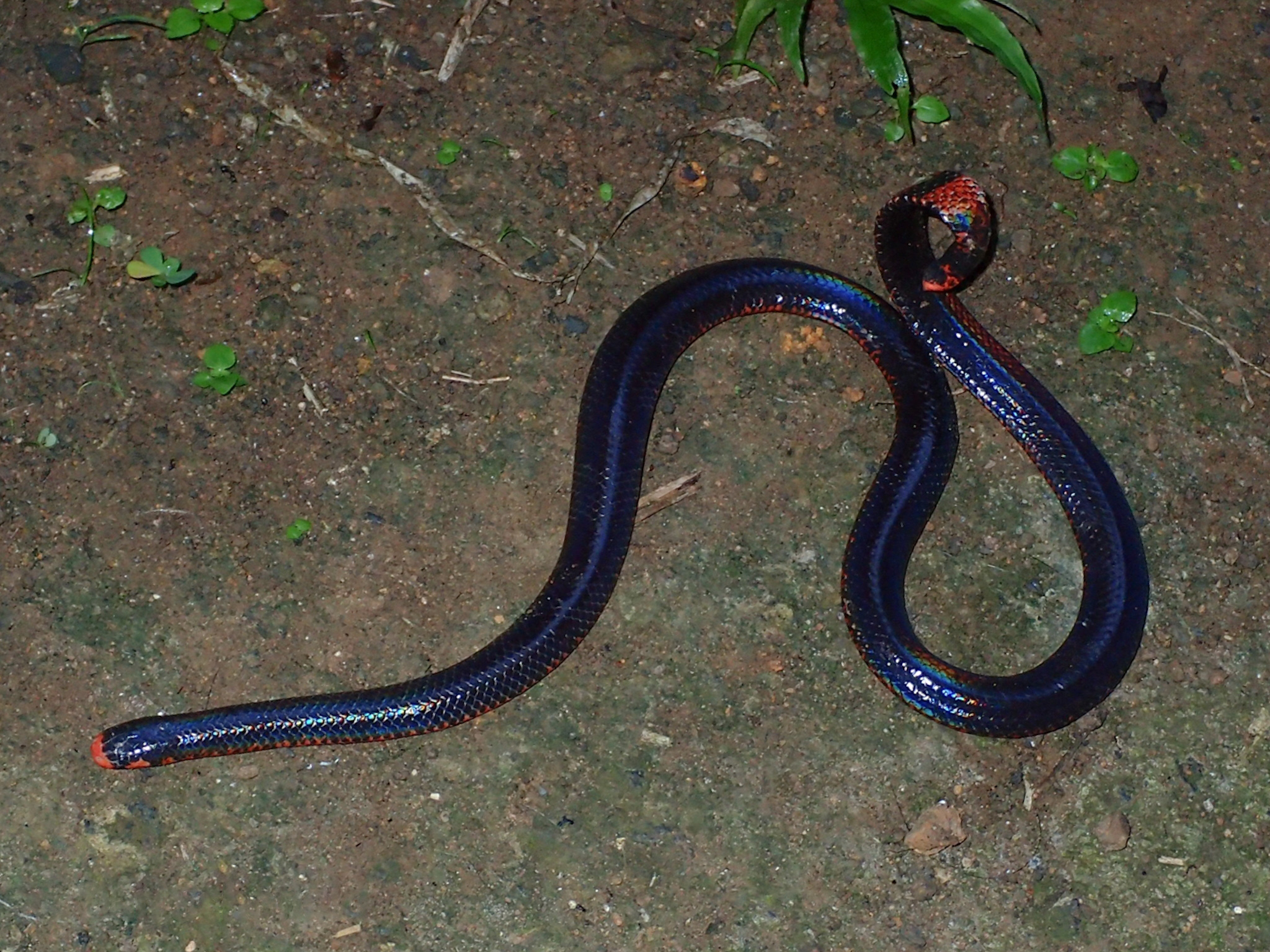

Conservation status
- Near Threatened (IUCN 3.1)

Scientific classification
- Kingdom: Animalia
- Phylum: Chordata
- Class: Reptilia
- Order: Squamata
- Suborder: Serpentes
- Family: Cylindrophiidae
- Genus: Cylindrophis
- Species: C. melanotus

Binomial name
- Cylindrophis melanotus Wagler, 1828

= Black pipe snake =

Species of snake

The black pipe snake (Cylindrophis melanotus) is a species of snake in the family Cylindrophiidae endemic to Indonesia.
