= Aru cylinder snake =

Conservation status
- Data Deficient (IUCN 3.1)

Scientific classification
- Kingdom: Animalia
- Phylum: Chordata
- Class: Reptilia
- Order: Squamata
- Suborder: Serpentes
- Family: Cylindrophiidae
- Genus: Cylindrophis
- Species: C. aruensis

Binomial name
- Cylindrophis aruensis Boulenger, 1920

Species of snake

The Aru cylinder snake (Cylindrophis aruensis) is a species of snake in the family Cylindrophiidae endemic to Indonesia.

== Description ==
The Aru cylinder snake is reddish brown, with white transverse spots forming two alternating series on the back and crossbars on the belly, some of which are complete, others interrupted, and the two halves alternating, with a pair of large white blotches on the nape of the neck; the lower surface of the tail is white.

It has no enlarged ventrals. The scales are in 24 rows, with six subcaudals.
