= Island pipe snake =

Conservation status
- Least Concern (IUCN 3.1)

Scientific classification
- Kingdom: Animalia
- Phylum: Chordata
- Class: Reptilia
- Order: Squamata
- Suborder: Serpentes
- Family: Cylindrophiidae
- Genus: Cylindrophis
- Species: C. opisthorhodus

Binomial name
- Cylindrophis opisthorhodus Boulenger, 1897

Species of snake

The island pipe snake (Cylindrophis opisthorhodus) is a species of snake in the Cylindrophiidae family endemic to Indonesia.

== Description ==
Dorsally, it is pale brown or buff, with small black spots irregularly disposed. The head is yellowish, much spotted with black. Ventrally, it is white, with continuous or broken and alternating black crossbars, which are connected on the sides by a black, uninterrupted stripe running from behind the head to the base of the tail; a much interrupted black stripe occurs along the middle of the belly. The anal region is black. The lower surface of the tail is bright pink (to which the specific epithet, opisthorhodus, meaning "rose posteriorly", refers).

The dorsal scales occur in 23 rows, and the ventrals, only slightly larger than the adjacent scales, are 184–187 in number; the anal scale is divided; it has six or seven subcaudal scales.
