= Cylindrophis yamdena =

Conservation status
- Data Deficient (IUCN 3.1)

Scientific classification
- Kingdom: Animalia
- Phylum: Chordata
- Class: Reptilia
- Order: Squamata
- Suborder: Serpentes
- Family: Cylindrophiidae
- Genus: Cylindrophis
- Species: C. yamdena

Binomial name
- Cylindrophis yamdena Smith & Sidik, 1998

Species of snake

Cylindrophis yamdena, the Yamdena pipe snake, is a species of snake of the family Cylindrophiidae.

The snake is found in Indonesia.
