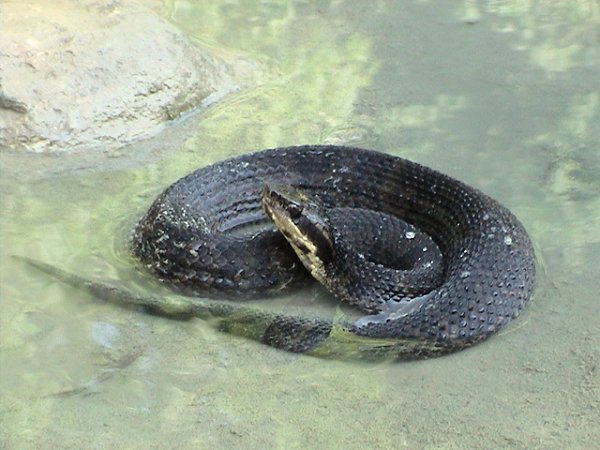

Scientific classification
- Kingdom: Animalia
- Phylum: Chordata
- Class: Reptilia
- Order: Squamata
- Suborder: Serpentes
- Family: Viperidae
- Genus: Agkistrodon
- Species: A. piscivorus
- Subspecies: A. p. leucostoma

Trinomial name
- Agkistrodon piscivorus leucostoma (Troost, 1836)

Synonyms
- Acontias leucostoma – Troost, 1836; [Toxicophis leucostoma] – Troost, 1836; Toxicophis leucostomus – Holbrook, 1842; Agkistrodon piscivorus leucostoma – Gloyd & Conant, 1943; Agkistrodon piscivorus leucostomus – H. M. Smith & Taylor, 1945; Agkistrodon piscivorus – F. T. Burbrink & T. J. Guiher. 2014

= Western cottonmouth =

Subspecies of snake

The western cottonmouth (Agkistrodon piscivorus leucostoma) was once classified as a subspecies of the cottonmouth (Agkistrodon piscivorus). However, DNA based studies published in 2008 and 2015, revealed no significant genetic difference between the eastern cottonmouth (Agkistrodon piscivorus piscivorus) and the western cottonmouth (Agkistrodon piscivorus leucostoma) and synonymized the two subspecies (with the oldest published name, A. p. piscivorus, having priority). The resulting taxonomy does not recognizes the western cottonmouth (A. p. leucostoma) as a valid taxon. Several subsequent reviews and species accounts have followed and supported the revised taxonomy. Information on this snake can be found in the Agkistrodon piscivorus article.

== Description ==
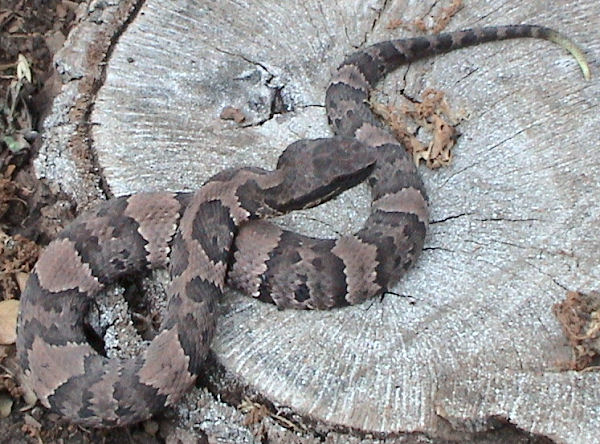
A. p. leucostoma, juvenile

Agkistrodon piscivorus leucostoma is a stout snake with a thick, muscular body. It is the smallest of the three subspecies of A. piscivorus. The average length of mature specimens is 27.5 inches (69.9 cm), while the maximum reported length is 62 inches (157.5 cm).

Adult specimens are usually dark gray or brown with little or no markings, although a dorsal color pattern consisting of 10 to 15 dark crossbands can be seen in some specimens. Like other members of the species, its color darkens with age, and very old specimens may appear entirely black. Unlike the other two subspecies (A. p. conanti and A. p. piscivorus), the light line that borders the dark cheek strip is usually not present in this subspecies. The dorsal scales are keeled, in rows of 25 near the midbody, and the anal scale is undivided. Its broad, flat head is distinctly wider than its neck, and it has an elliptical (cat-like) pupil. By day the pupil appears as a narrow slit; at night the pupil is wide and may even look round.

== Behavior ==
The animal opens its mouth widely when startled, exposing its whitish-colored oral mucosa; this is the reason it is commonly referred to as the "cottonmouth".

== Common names ==
Western cottonmouth, water moccasin, cottonmouth, (black) moccasin, blunt-tail moccasin, (northern) cottonmouth moccasin, stump-tail (water) moccasin, viper, western cottonmouth moccasin, cotton-mouthed snake, Congo snake, trap-jaw, gapper.

== Geographic range ==
Found in the United States, from southern Alabama along coast of the Gulf of Mexico, including many offshore islands, to southeastern and central Texas and north to Oklahoma, Missouri, Illinois, Indiana, and southeastern Nebraska, and western Kentucky. The type locality given is "western district of Tennessee". Schmidt (1953) proposed that this be amended to "10 miles northeast of Bolivar, Hardeman County, Tennessee".
