= Cylindrophis slowinskii =

Scientific classification
- Kingdom: Animalia
- Phylum: Chordata
- Class: Reptilia
- Order: Squamata
- Suborder: Serpentes
- Family: Cylindrophiidae
- Genus: Cylindrophis
- Species: C. slowinskii

Binomial name
- Cylindrophis slowinskii Kieckbusch, Mecke, Hartmann, Ehrmantraut, O’Shea, & Kaiser, 2020

Species of snake

Cylindrophis slowinskii, Slowinski's pipe snake, is a species of snake of the family Cylindrophiidae.

The snake is found in Myanmar.
