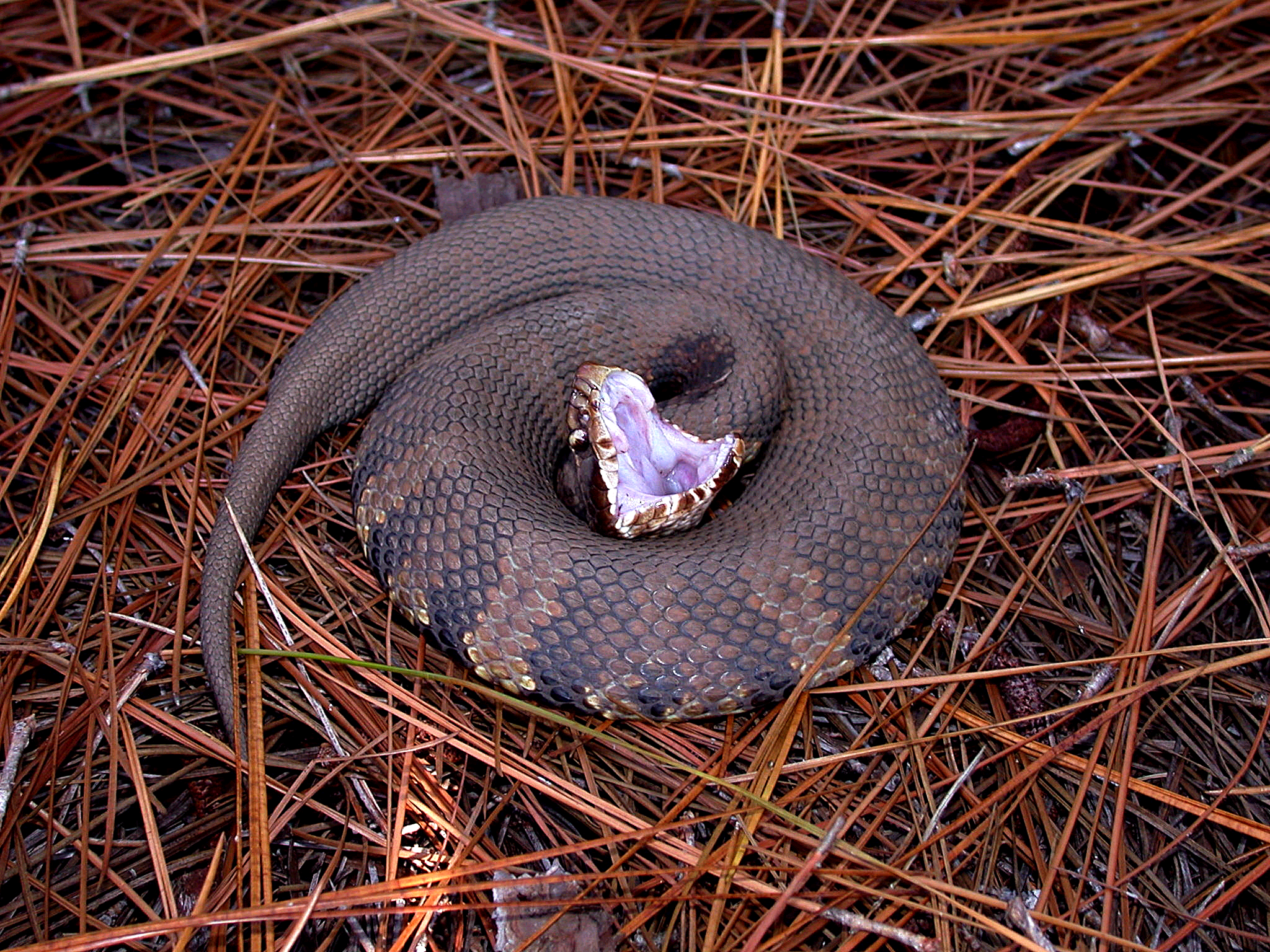

Conservation status
- Least Concern (IUCN 3.1)

Scientific classification
- Kingdom: Animalia
- Phylum: Chordata
- Class: Reptilia
- Order: Squamata
- Suborder: Serpentes
- Family: Viperidae
- Genus: Agkistrodon
- Species: A. piscivorus

Binomial name
- Agkistrodon piscivorus (Lacépède, 1789)

Synonyms
- click to expand: •Vipera aquatica (not a binomial) Catesby, 1743; •Crot[alus]. Piscivorus Lacépède, 1789; •C[rotalus]. Aquaticus Bonnaterre, 1790; •Scytale piscivora — Sonnini & Latreille, 1801; •Coluber Aquaticus — Shaw, 1802; •Ancistrodon piscivorus — Cope, 1860; •A[ncistrodon]. pugnax Cope, 1860; •T[rigonocephalus]. piscivorus var. pugnax — Jan, 1863; •Vipera Cench[ris]. Piscivorus — Higgins, 1873; •Ancistrodon piscivorus Lacépède, ssp. piscivorus — Cope, 1875; •Ancistrodon piscivorus Lacépède, ssp. pugnax — Cope, 1875; •Ancistrodon piscivorus piscivorus — Yarrow, 1882; •Ancistrodon piscivorus pugnax — Yarrow, 1882; •[Ancistrodon piscivorus] Var. pugnax — Garman, 1884; •Agkistrodon piscivorus — Garman, 1890; •Ancistrodon piscivorus — Boulenger, 1896; •Agkistrodon piscivorus piscivorus — Gloyd & Conant, 1943; •Ancistrodon piscivorus piscivorus — Schmidt, 1953; •Agkistrodon piscivorus laurae Stewart, 1974; •Agkistrodon piscivorus — Gloyd & Conant, 1990

= Agkistrodon piscivorus =

Agkistrodon piscivorus Temporal range: Pleistocene - present

Species of reptile

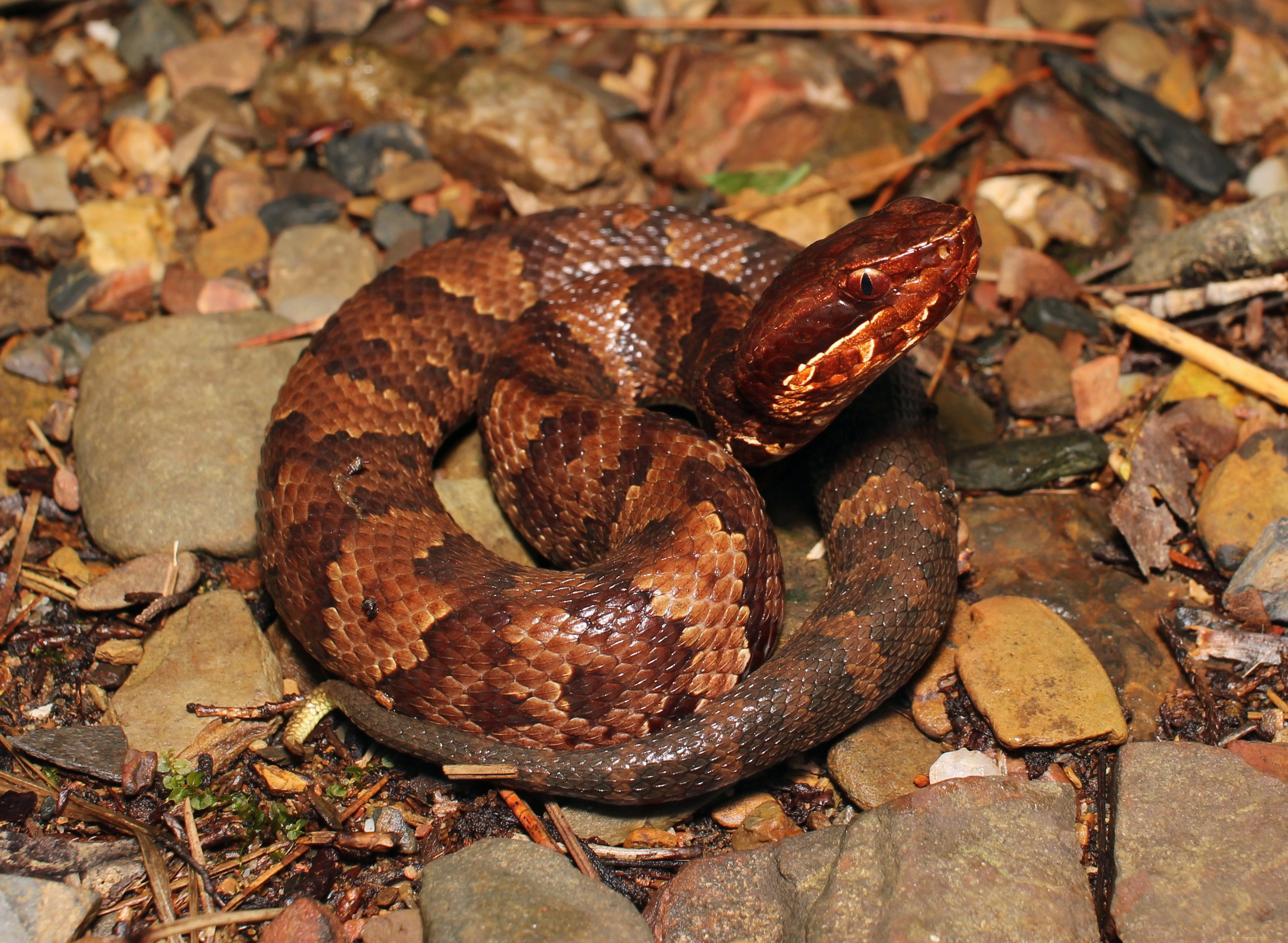
This snake was found on the edge of a creek in Oklahoma.

Agkistrodon piscivorus is a species of venomous snake, a pit viper in the subfamily Crotalinae of the family Viperidae. It is one of the world's few semiaquatic vipers (along with the Florida cottonmouth), and is native to the Southeastern United States. As an adult, it is large and capable of delivering a painful and potentially fatal bite. When threatened, it may respond by coiling its body and displaying its fangs. Individuals may bite when feeling threatened or being handled in any way. It tends to be found in or near water, particularly in slow-moving and shallow lakes, streams, and marshes. It is a capable swimmer, and like several species of snakes, is known to occasionally enter bays and estuaries and swim between barrier islands and the mainland.

== Taxonomy and etymology ==
The generic name is derived from the Greek words ἄγκιστρον agkistron "fish-hook, hook" and ὀδών odon "tooth", and the specific name comes from the Latin piscis 'fish' and voro '(I) eat greedily, devour'; thus, the scientific name translates to "hook-toothed fish-eater". Common names include cottonmouth, northern cottonmouth, water moccasin, swamp moccasin, black moccasin, and simply viper. Many of the common names refer to the threat display, in which this species often stands its ground and gapes at an intruder, exposing the white lining of its mouth. Many scientists dislike the use of the term water moccasin since it can lead to confusion between the venomous cottonmouth and nonvenomous water snakes.

=== Common names ===
This is a list of common names for A. piscivorus, some of which also refer to other species:

- aquatic moccasin
- black moccasin
- black snake
- black water viper
- blunt-tail moccasin
- Congo
- copperhead
- cottonmouth
- cotton-mouthed snake
- cottonmouth rattler
- cottonmouth water moccasin
- gaper
- gapper
- highland moccasin
- lake moccasin
- lowland moccasin
- mangrove rattler
- moccasin
- moccasin snake
- North American cottonmouth snake
- North American water moccasin
- North American water viper
- pond moccasin
- pond rattler
- river moccasin
- river rattler
- rusty moccasin
- saltwater rattler
- short-tailed moccasin
- short-tail rattler
- small-tailed cottonmouth
- snap-jaw
- stub-tail
- stub-tail snake
- stump moccasin
- stump-tail moccasin
- stump-tail viper
- swamp lion
- swamp moccasin
- swamp rattler
- Texas moccasin
- trap jaw
- Troost's moccasin
- true horn snake
- true water moccasin
- viper
- water copperhead
- water mamba
- water moccasin
- water mokeson
- water pilot
- water pit rattler
- water pit viper
- water rattlesnake
- water viper
- white-mouth moccasin
- white-mouth rattler
- worm-tailed viper

=== Subspecies and taxonomic history ===
For many decades, one species with three subspecies were formally recognized: eastern cottonmouth, A. p. piscivorus (Lacépède, 1789); western cottonmouth, A. p. leucostoma (Troost, 1836); and Florida cottonmouth, A. p. conanti Gloyd, 1969. However, a molecular DNA-based study was published in 2014, applying phylogenetic theories (one implication being no subspecies are recognized), changing the long-standing taxonomy. The resulting and current taxonomic arrangement recognizes two species and no subspecies. The western cottonmouth (A. p. leucostoma) was synonymized with the eastern cottonmouth (A. p. piscivorus) into one species (with the oldest published name, A. p. piscivorus, having priority). The Florida cottonmouth (A. p. conanti) is now recognized as a separate species.

- Agkistrodon piscivorus (Lacépéde, 1789), northern cottonmouth
- Agkistrodon conanti Gloyd, 1969, Florida cottonmouth (south Georgia and Florida peninsula)

Previous taxonomy	Current taxonomy (as of 2014)	Geographic range
Eastern cottonmouth Agkistrodon piscivorus piscivorus (Lacépède, 1789)	Northern cottonmouth Agkistrodon piscivorus (Lacépède, 1789)	The United States in Delmarva Peninsula, the Atlantic Coastal Plain and lower Piedmont of North and South Carolina, to eastern Georgia including outer banks and offshore islands.
Western cottonmouth Agkistrodon piscivorus leucostoma (Troost, 1836)	Northern cottonmouth Agkistrodon piscivorus (Lacépède, 1789)	The United States, most of Alabama along coast of the Gulf of Mexico, including many offshore islands, to central Texas, and north to Oklahoma, Missouri, Illinois, and Indiana
Florida cottonmouth Agkistrodon piscivorus conanti Gloyd, 1969	Florida cottonmouth Agkistrodon conanti Gloyd, 1969	The United States, in southern Georgia and Florida peninsular, including many offshore islands

== Anatomy and description ==
Agkistrodon piscivorus is the largest species of the genus Agkistrodon. Adults commonly exceed 80 cm (31 in) in total length (including tail); females are typically smaller than males. Total length, per one study of adults, was 65 to 90 cm (26 to 35 in). Average body mass has been found to be 292.5 to 579.6 g (10.32 to 20.44 oz) in males and 201.1 to 254.1 g (7.09 to 8.96 oz) in females. Occasionally, individuals may exceed 180 cm (71 in) in total length, especially in the eastern part of the range, with a record specimen of 189.2 cm (74.5 in).

Although larger ones have purportedly been seen in the wild, according to Gloyd and Conant (1990), the largest recorded specimen of A. p. piscivorus was 188 cm (74 in) in total length, based on a specimen caught in the Dismal Swamp region and given to the Philadelphia Zoological Garden. This snake had apparently been injured during capture, died several days later, and was measured when straight and relaxed. Large specimens can be extremely bulky, with the mass of a specimen of about 180 cm (71 in) in total length known to weigh 4.6 kg (10 lb).

Many would assume that the morphology of an aquatic snake should have a small, narrow head that tapers towards the back to minimize drag in the water, especially when capturing prey. However, the pit vipers, and particularly cottonmouths, display a contradicting structure, with its bulky, triangular head, which would be assumed to be poorly suited to water, yet it is not the case.

The broad head is distinct from the neck, and the snout is blunt in profile with the rim of the top of the head extending forwards slightly further than the mouth. Substantial cranial plates are present, although the parietal plates are often fragmented, especially towards the rear. A loreal scale is absent. Six to 9 supralabials and eight to 12 infralabials are seen. At midbody, it has 23–27 rows of dorsal scales. All dorsal scale rows have keels, although those on the lowermost scale rows are weak. In males/females, the ventral scales number 130-145/128-144 and the subcaudals 38-54/36-50. Many of the latter may be divided.

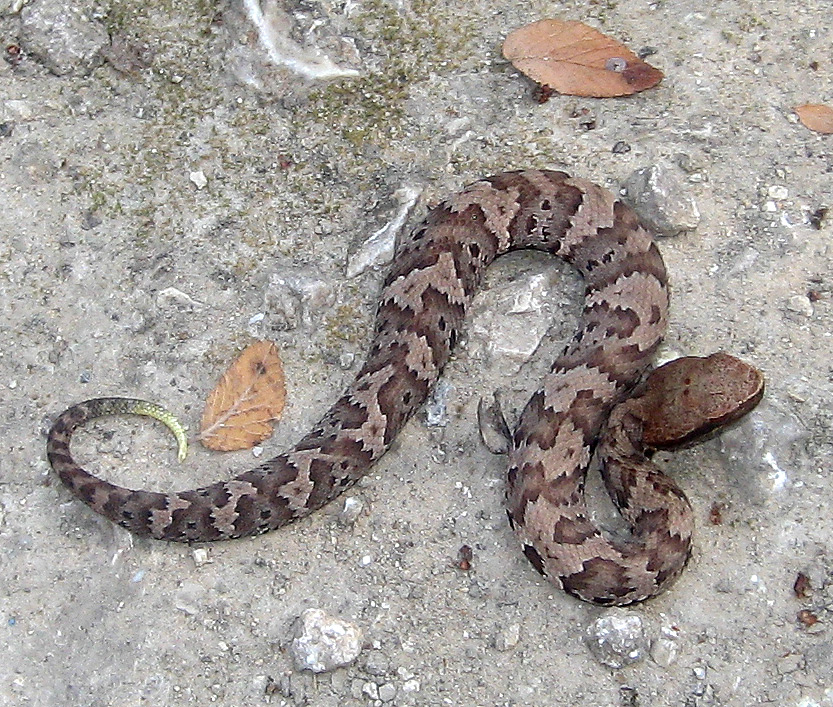
Juvenile cottonmouth

Though most specimens are almost or even totally black, (with the exception of the head and facial markings), the color pattern may consist of a brown, gray, tan, yellowish-olive, or blackish ground color, which is overlaid with a series of 10–17 dark brown to almost black crossbands. These crossbands, which usually have black edges, are sometimes broken along the dorsal midline to form a series of staggered halfbands on either side of the body. These crossbands are visibly lighter in the center, almost matching the ground color, often contain irregular dark markings, and extend well down onto the ventral scales. The dorsal banding pattern fades with age, so older individuals are an almost uniform olive-brown, grayish-brown, or black. The belly is white, yellowish-white, or tan, marked with dark spots, and becomes darker posteriorly. The amount of dark pigment on the belly varies from virtually none to almost completely black. The head is a more or less uniform brown color, especially in A. p. piscivorus. Subadult specimens may exhibit the same kind of dark, parietal spots characteristic of A. contortrix, but sometimes these are still visible in adults. Eastern populations have a broad, dark, postocular stripe, bordered with pale pigment above and below, that is faint or absent in western populations. The underside of the head is generally whitish, cream, or tan. Specimens between 26.8 cm and 120.3 cm snout-vent lengths displayed various dorsal colors (including white, tan, brown, and black). Those greater than 60 cm snout-vent length had less white and tan colors.

Juvenile and subadult specimens generally have a more contrasting color pattern, with dark crossbands on a lighter ground color. The ground color is then tan, brown, or reddish-brown. The tip of the tail is usually yellowish, becoming greenish-yellow or greenish in subadults, and then black in adults. On some juveniles, the banding pattern can also be seen on the tail. Young snakes wiggle the tips of their tails to lure prey animals.

This species is often confused with the copperhead, A. contortrix. This is especially true for juveniles, but differences exist. A. piscivorus has broad, dark stripes on the sides of its head that extend back from the eyes, whereas A. contortrix has only a thin, dark line that divides the pale supralabials from the somewhat darker color of the head. The watersnakes of the genus Nerodia are also similar in appearance, being thick-bodied with large heads, but they have round pupils, no loreal pit, a single anal plate, subcaudal scales that are divided throughout, and a distinctive overall color pattern.

=== Venom ===
Agkistrodon piscivorus venom is more toxic than that of A. contortrix, and is rich with powerful cytotoxic venom that destroys tissue. Although deaths are rare, the bite can leave scars, and on occasion, require amputation. Absent an anaphylactic reaction in a bitten individual, however, the venom does not cause systemic reactions in victims and does not contain neurotoxic components present in numerous rattlesnake species. Bites can be effectively treated with CroFab antivenom; this serum is derived using venom components from four species of American pit vipers (the eastern and western diamondback rattlesnakes, the Mojave rattlesnake, and the cottonmouth).

Bites from the cottonmouth are relatively frequent in the lower Mississippi River Valley and along the coast of the Gulf of Mexico, although fatalities are rare. Allen and Swindell (1948) compiled a record of A. piscivorus bites in Florida from newspaper accounts and data from the Bureau of Vital Statistics: 1934, eight bites and three fatalities (no further fatalities were recorded after this year); 1935, 10; 1936, 16; 1937, 7; 1938, 6; 1939, 5; 1940, 3; 1941, 6; 1942, 3; 1943, 1; 1944, 3; 1998, 1. Wright and Wright (1957) report having encountered these snakes on countless occasions, often almost stepping on them, but never being bitten. In addition, they heard of no reports of any bites among 400 cypress cutters in the Okefenokee Swamp during the entire summer of 1921. These accounts suggest that the species is not particularly aggressive. Studies show that stressed snakes are more likely to strike. This action comes as a predator defense mechanism. Snakes with elevated hormone levels are more likely to strike. Additionally, larger snakes are more likely to strike than smaller snakes.

Brown (1973) gave an average venom yield (dried) of 125 mg, with a range of 80–237 mg, along with LD_{50} values of 4.0, 2.2, 2.7, 3.5, 2.0 mg/kg IV, 4.8, 5.1, 4.0, 5.5, 3.8, 6.8 mg/kg IP and 25.8 mg/kg SC for toxicity. Wolff and Githens (1939) described a 152 cm (60 in) specimen that yielded 3.5 ml of venom during the first extraction and 4.0 ml five weeks later (1.094 grams of dried venom). The human lethal dose is unknown, but has been estimated at 100–150 mg.

Symptoms commonly include ecchymosis and swelling. The pain is generally more severe than bites from the copperhead, but less so than those from rattlesnakes (Crotalus spp.). The formation of vesicles and bullae is less common than with rattlesnake bites, although necrosis can occur. Myokymia is sometimes reported. However, the venom has strong proteolytic activity that can lead to severe tissue destruction.

== Geographic range ==
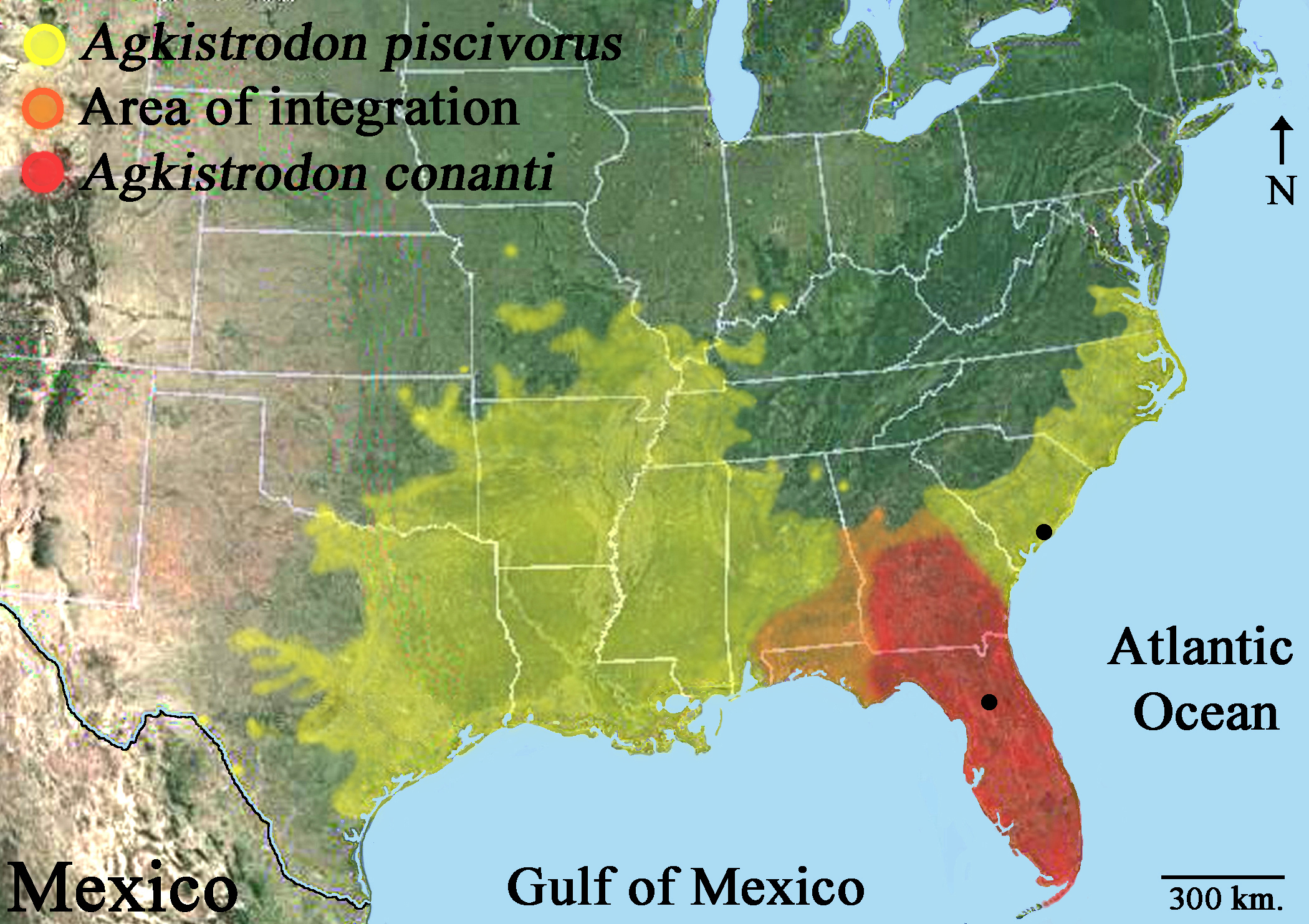
Geographic distribution of the two species of cottonmouth, Agkistrodon piscivorus and Agkistrodon conanti

A. piscivorus is found in the eastern US from the Great Dismal Swamp in southeast Virginia, south through the Florida peninsula and west to Arkansas, eastern and southern Oklahoma, and western and southern Georgia (excluding Lake Lanier and Lake Allatoona). A few records exist of the species being found along the Rio Grande in Texas, but these are thought to represent disjunct populations, now possibly eradicated. The type locality given is "Carolina", although Schmidt (1953) proposed this be restricted to the area around Charleston, South Carolina. Snakes observed in the northern areas of this range are typically larger older individuals.

Campbell and Lamar (2004) mentioned this species as being found in Alabama, Arkansas, Florida, Georgia, Illinois, Indiana, Kentucky, Louisiana, Mississippi, Missouri, North Carolina, Oklahoma, South Carolina, Tennessee, Texas, and Virginia. Maps provided by Campbell and Lamar (2004) and Wright and Wright (1957) also indicate its presence in Western and Middle Tennessee and extreme southeastern Kansas, and limit it to the western part of Kentucky.

In Georgia, it is found in the southern half of the state up to a few kilometers north of the Fall Line with few exceptions. Its range also includes the Ohio River Valley as far north as southern Indiana, and it inhabits many barrier islands off the coasts of the states where it is found.

== Habitat ==
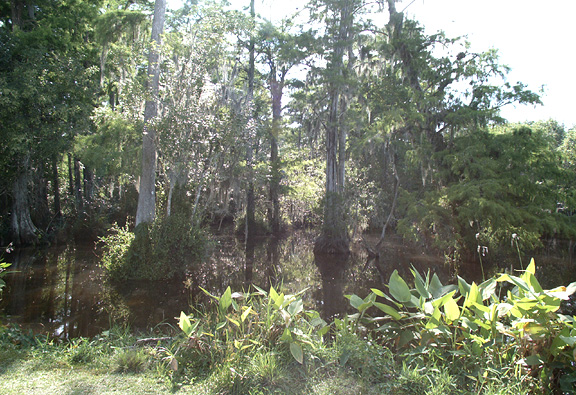
A cypress swamp in Big Cypress National Preserve, south Florida

Agkistrodon piscivorus is the most aquatic species of the genus Agkistrodon, and is usually associated with bodies of water, such as creeks, streams, marshes, swamps, and the shores of ponds and lakes. This species has a unique swimming pattern and appears to be floating on top of the water rather than swimming with its body beneath the surface. The U.S. Navy (1991) describes it as inhabiting swamps, shallow lakes, and sluggish streams, but it is usually not found in swift, deep, cool water. Behler and King (1979) list its habitats as including lowland swamps, lakes, rivers, bayheads, sloughs, irrigation ditches, canals, rice fields, and small, clear, rocky, mountain streams.

It is also found in brackish-water habitats and is sometimes seen swimming in salt water. It has been much more successful at colonizing Atlantic and Gulf Coast barrier islands than the copperhead. Even on these islands, though, it tends to favor freshwater marshes. A study by Dunson and Freda (1985) describes it as not being particularly salt-tolerant.

The snake is not limited to aquatic habitats, however, as Gloyd and Conant (1990) mentioned large specimens have been found more than a mile (1.6 km) from water. In various locations, the species is well-adapted to less moist environments, such as palmetto thickets, pine-palmetto forest, pine woods in East Texas, pine flatwoods in Florida, eastern deciduous dune forest, dune and beach areas, riparian forest, and prairies.

== Behavior and ecology ==
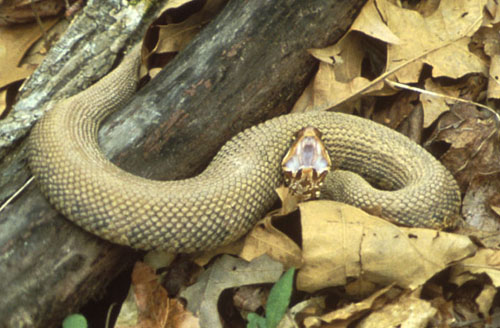
A. p. piscivorus – gaping is part of the typical defensive display, the white mouth giving it the nickname "cottonmouth".

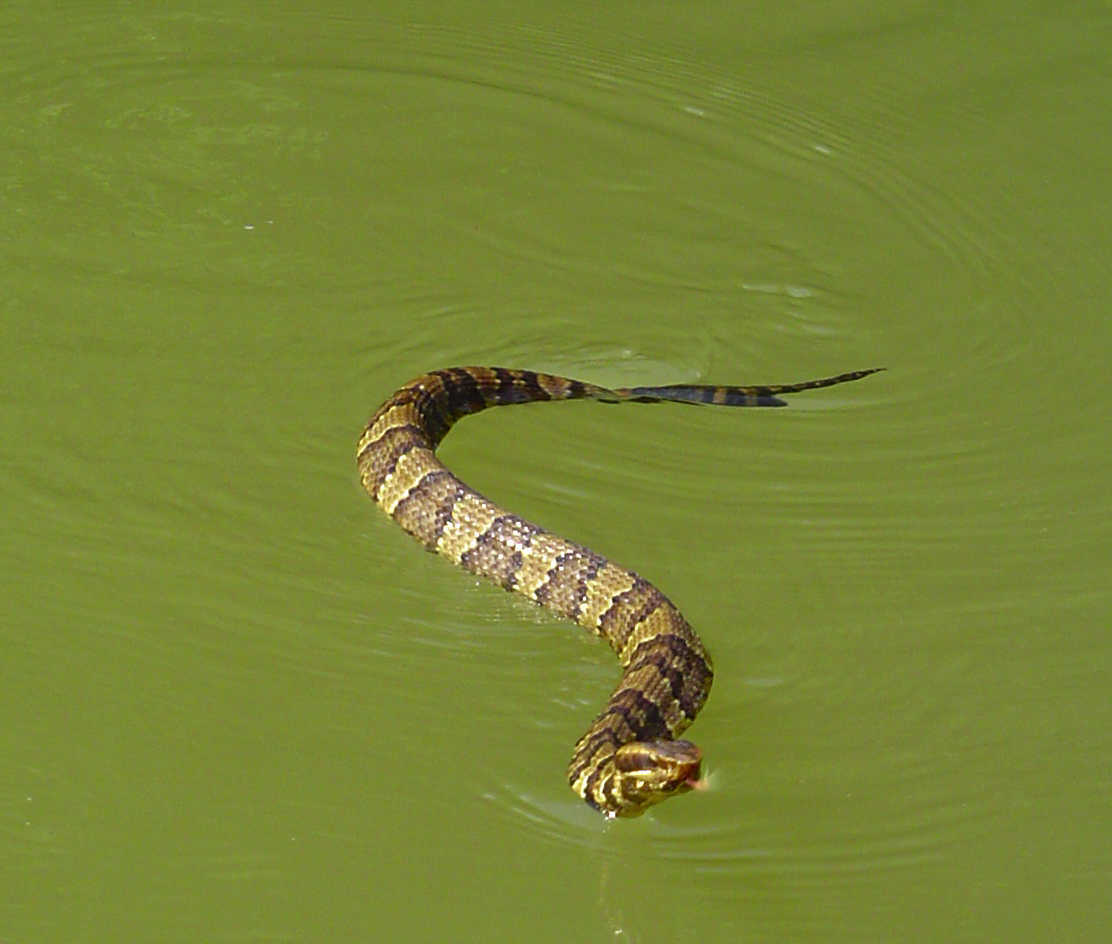
A cottonmouth in water in Tennessee – the high position in the water and upward-tilted head can help distinguish it from Nerodia watersnakes such as the common watersnake, although there is substantial similarity.

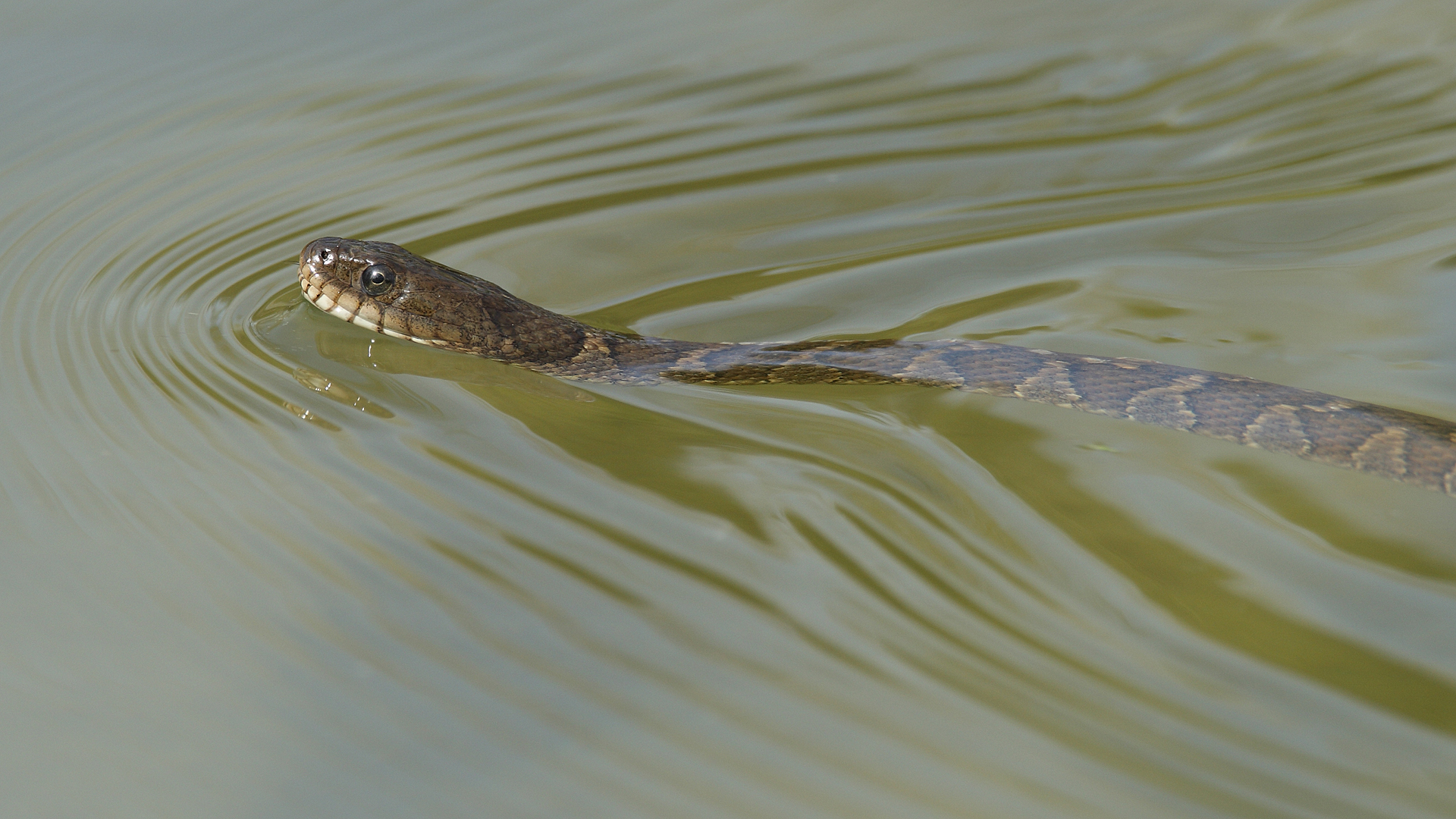
A common watersnake (Nerodia sipedon) swimming – a nonvenomous species, is often mistaken for the cottonmouth.

In the United States, especially in the south, A. piscivorus are often falsely characterized as aggressive. In tests designed to measure the various behavioral responses by wild specimens to encounters with people, 23 of 45 (51%) tried to escape, while 28 of 36 (78%) resorted to threat displays and other defensive tactics. Only when they were picked up with a mechanical hand were they likely to bite. 36% of those picked up attempted to bite. Furthermore, less than 20% attempted to bite when stepped on. None of the snakes attempted to bite when researchers stood next to them.

When approached by humans, cottonmouths seek the closest shelter possible. At times this means moving closer to humans, giving the impression that it is seeking to harm them. This behavior is often seen in conjunction with a raising of the head, leading to further misinterpretations.

When sufficiently stressed or threatened, this species engages in a characteristic threat display that includes vibrating its tail and throwing its head back with its mouth open to display the startlingly white interior, often making a loud hiss while the neck and front part of the body are pulled into an S-shaped position. Many of its common names, including "cottonmouth" and "gaper", refer to this behavior, while its habit of snapping its jaws shut when anything touches its mouth has earned it the name "trap jaw" in some areas. Other defensive responses can include flattening the body and emitting a strong, pungent secretion from the anal glands located at the base of the tail. This musk may be ejected in thin jets if the snake is sufficiently agitated or restrained. The smell has been likened to that of a billy goat, as well as to a genus of common flood-plain weeds, Pluchea, that also have a penetrating odor.

Harmless watersnakes of the genus Nerodia are often mistaken for it. These are also semiaquatic, thick-bodied snakes with large heads that can be aggressive when provoked, but they behave differently. For example, watersnakes usually flee quickly into the water, while A. piscivorus often stands its ground with its threat display. In addition, watersnakes do not vibrate their tails when excited. A. piscivorus usually holds its head at an angle around 45° when swimming or crawling.

John Haynes Brown considered their heavy muscular bodies to be a striking characteristic, stating this made it difficult to hold them for venom extraction owing to their strength.

This species may be active during the day and at night, but on bright, sunny days, they are usually found coiled or stretched out in the shade. In the morning and on cool days, they can often be seen basking in the sunlight. They often emerge at sunset to warm themselves on warm ground (e.g. sidewalks and roads) and then become very active throughout the night, when they are usually found swimming or crawling. Contrary to popular belief, they are capable of biting while under water.

A number of parasites are known to inhabit the species. Examples of parasitic species include K. coarctatus and P. ctotali. The parasites are known to cause infection of the lungs, but not inflammation.

In the north, they hibernate during the winter. Niell (1947, 1948) made observations in Georgia, and noted they were one of the last species to seek shelter, often being found active until the first heavy frosts. At this point, they moved to higher ground and could be found in rotting pine stumps by tearing away the bark. These snakes could be quite active upon discovery and would then attempt to burrow more deeply into the soft wood or escape to the nearest water. In southeastern Virginia, Wood (1954) reported seeing migratory behavior in late October and early November. During a period of three or four days, as many as 50 individuals could be seen swimming across Back Bay from the bayside swamps of the barrier islands to the mainland. He suggested this might have something to do with hibernating habits. In the southern parts of its range, hibernation may be short or omitted altogether.

=== Hunting and diet ===
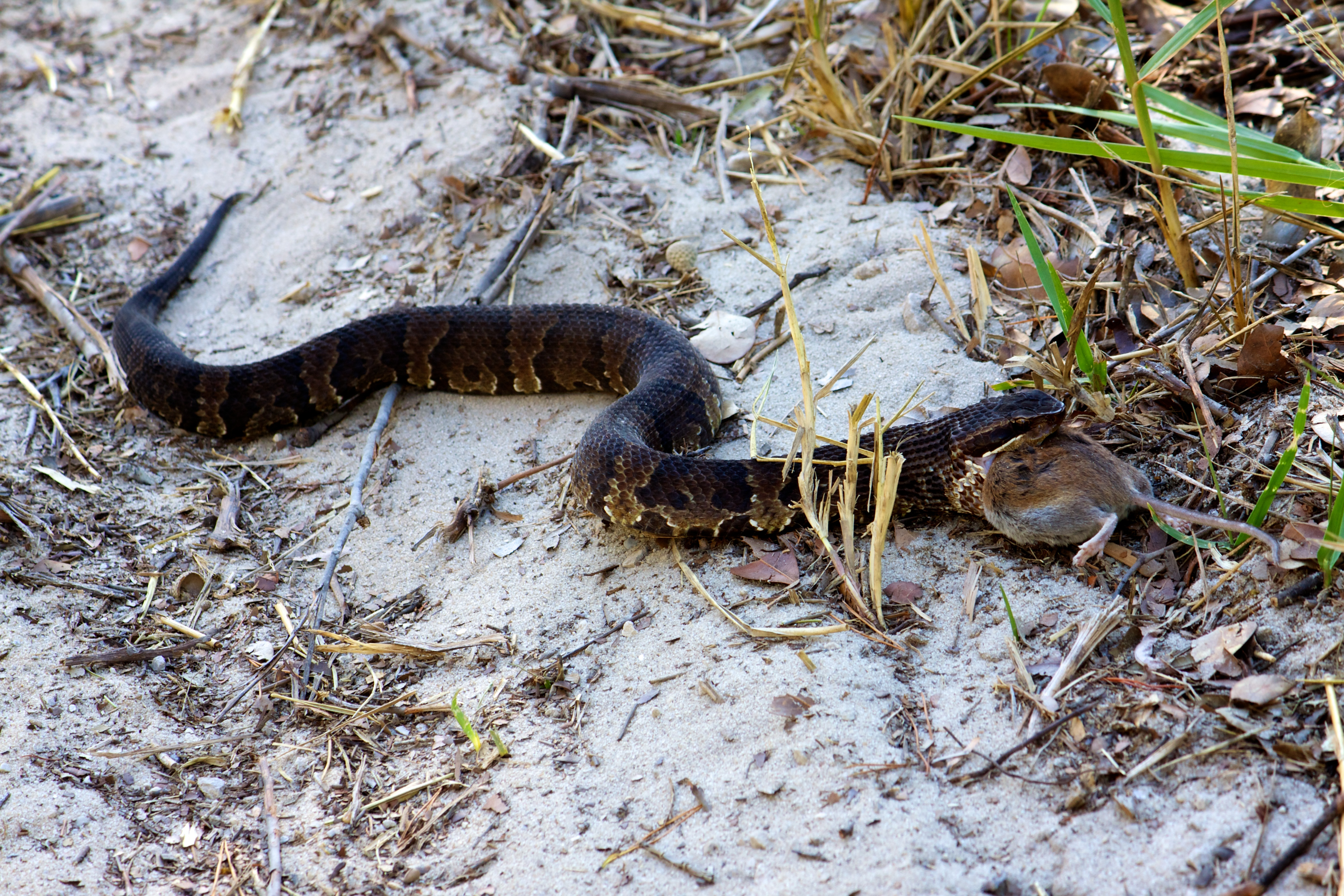
Northern cottonmouth (Agkistrodon piscivorus) eating a rodent, Bon Secour National Wildlife Refuge, Alabama (23 October 2011)

Raymond Ditmars (1912) described A. piscivorus as carnivorous. Its diet includes mammals, birds, amphibians, fish, eggs, insects, other snakes, small turtles, and juvenile alligators. Cannibalism has also been reported. Normally, though, the bulk of its diet consists of fish and frogs. On occasion, juvenile specimens feed on invertebrates. Catfish (especially of the genus Ictalurus) are often eaten, although the sharp spines sometimes cause injuries. Toads of the genus Bufo are apparently avoided. Common prey species include southern leopard frogs, bass, juvenile black rat snakes, young common snapping turtles, and North American least shrews.

Many authors have described the prey items taken under natural circumstances. Although fish and frogs are their most common prey, they eat almost any small vertebrate. Like many other vipers, A. piscivorus starts its predatory sequence by tongue flicking before moving towards their prey. Fish are captured by cornering them in shallow water, usually against the bank or under logs. They take advantage when bodies of water begin to dry up in the summer or early fall and gorge themselves on the resulting high concentrations of fish and tadpoles. They are surprisingly unsuccessful at seizing either live or dead fish under water.

They are opportunistic hunters and sometimes eat carrion, making them one of the few snakes to do so. Campbell and Lamar (2004) described having seen them feeding on fish heads and viscera that had been thrown into the water from a dock. Heinrich and Studenroth (1996) reported an occasion in which an individual was seen feeding on the butchered remains of a feral hog (Sus scrofa) that had been thrown into Cypress Creek. Northern cottonmouths have an unusual feeding adaptation that allows them to adhere to prey through rotation of their head during swallowing because it aids the jaws in clearing the prey and contributes to the advance of the jaws along the prey.

Conant (1929) gave a detailed account of the feeding behavior of a captive specimen from South Carolina. When prey was introduced, the snake quickly became attentive and made an attack. Frogs and small birds were seized and held until movement stopped. Larger prey was approached in a more cautious manner; a rapid strike was executed after which the snake would withdraw. In 2.5 years, the snake had accepted three species of frogs, including a large bullfrog, a spotted salamander, water snakes, garter snakes, sparrows, young rats, and three species of mice. Brimley (1944) described a captive specimen that ate copperheads (A. contortrix), as well as members of its own species, keeping its fangs embedded in its victims until they had been immobilized. A 2018 study found that northern cottonmouths on a diet of only fish when compared to a diet of mice had to eat 20% more to achieve the same growth.

There have been several studies focusing on the types of prey that cottonmouths consume, and analyzing the differences between juveniles, adult males, and adult females. It has been found that adult males and females target different prey types and sizes. Observations and stomach analyses show that adult males consume fish, whereas adult females mainly consume other squamates, particularly snakes. In this same research, it was concluded that the prey size increased with the size of the snake for both juvenile and adults, both male and female.

Young individuals have yellowish or greenish tail tips and engage in caudal luring. The tail tip is wriggled to lure prey, such as frogs and lizards, within striking distance. Wharton (1960) observed captive specimens exhibiting this behavior between 07:20 and 19:40 hours, which suggests it is a daytime activity.

In August 2020 and May 2021, individuals found in Florida were observed to have consumed introduced Burmese pythons (Python bivittatus). Burmese pythons are an invasive species in Florida with the capacity to inflict great damage to the local ecosystem, so it is hoped that A. piscivorus may be in the process of modifying its diet to enable it to hunt the pythons.

=== Natural predators ===
Agkistrodon piscivorus is preyed upon by snapping turtles (Chelydra serpentina), falcons, American alligators (Alligator mississippiensis), horned owls (Bubo virginianus), eagles, red-shouldered hawks (Buteo lineatus), loggerhead shrikes (Lanius ludovicianus), and large wading birds, such as herons, cranes, and egrets. The combination of its usage as both a cosmopolitan predator and cosmopolitan prey implies they are extremely instrumental to wetland food-chains.

It is also preyed upon by ophiophagous snakes, including their own species. Humphreys (1881) described how a 34-inch (86 cm) specimen was killed and eaten by a 42-inch (1.1 m) captive kingsnake. On the other hand, Neill (1947) reported captive kingsnakes (Lampropeltis getula) were loath to attack them, being successfully repelled with "body blows". Also called body-bridging, this is a specific defensive behavior against ophiophagous snakes, first observed in certain rattlesnake (Crotalus) species by Klauber (1927), that involves raising a section of the middle of the body above the ground to varying heights. This raised loop may then be held in this position for varying amounts of time, shifted in position, or moved towards the attacker. In the latter case, it is often flipped or thrown vigorously in the direction of the assailant. In A. piscivorus, the loop is raised laterally, with the belly facing towards the attacker.

== Reproduction ==
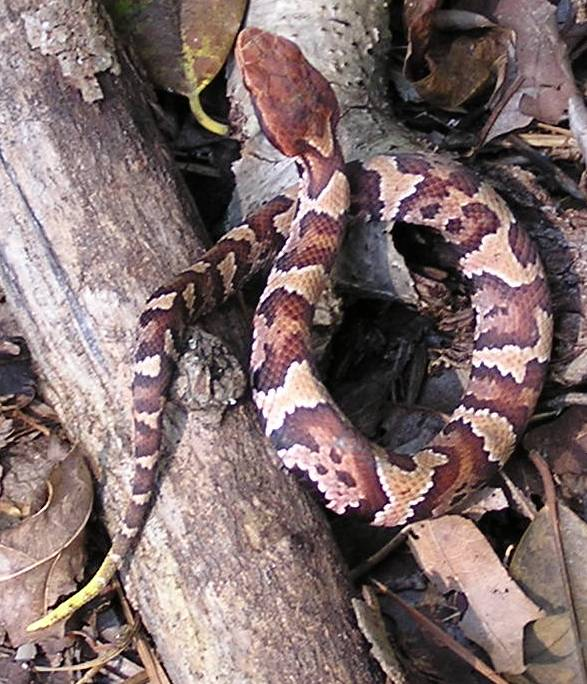
Newborn A. piscivorus, showing characteristic high-contrast markings and yellow tail tip

Agkistrodon piscivorus is ovoviviparous, with females usually giving birth to one to sixteen live young and possibly as many as 20. Litters of six to eight are the most common. Neonates are 22–35 cm (8.7–13.8 in) in length (excluding runts), with the largest belonging to A. p. conanti and A. p. leucostoma the smallest. If weather conditions are favorable and food is readily available, growth is rapid and females may reproduce at less than three years of age and a total length of as little as 60 cm (24 in). They will also only reproduce every other year, unless optimal conditions are met for them to go through the reproduction process. Cottonmouths breed seasonally, and they are believed to be monogamous. The young are born in August or September, while mating may occur during any of the warmer months of the year, at least in certain parts of its range.

Regarding A. p. piscivorus, an early account by Stejneger (1895) described a pair in the Berlin Zoological Garden that mated on January 21, 1873, after which eight neonates were discovered in the cage on July 16 of that year. The young were each 26 cm (10 in) in length and 1.5 cm (0.59 in) thick. They shed for the first time within two weeks, after which they accepted small frogs, but not fish.

The effects of central fusion and terminal fusion on heterozygosity

Combat behavior between males has been reported on a number of occasions, and is very similar in form to that seen in many other viperid species. An important factor in sexual selection, it allows for the establishment and recognition of dominance as males compete for access to sexually active females.

A few accounts exist that describe females defending their newborn litters. Wharten (1960, 1966) reported several cases where females found near their young stood their ground and considered these to be examples of guarding behavior. Another case was described by Walters and Card (1996) in which a female was found at the entrance of a chamber with seven neonates crawling on or around her. When one of the young was moved a short distance from the chamber, she seemed to be agitated and faced the intruder. Eventually, all of her offspring retreated into the chamber, but the female remained at the entrance, ready to strike. One study stated that females will remain with their young for one to two weeks until the young finishes their first shed cycle.

=== Facultative parthenogenesis ===
Parthenogenesis is a natural form of reproduction in which growth and development of embryos occur without fertilization. A. piscivorus can reproduce by facultative parthenogenesis, that is, they are capable of switching from a sexual mode of reproduction to an asexual mode. This likely involves recombination at the tips of the chromosomes, which leads to genome wide homozygosity. The result is the expression of deleterious recessive alleles and often to developmental failure (inbreeding depression). Both captive-born and wild-born A. piscivorus specimens appear to be capable of this form of parthenogenesis.

== Conservation status ==
The species A. piscivorus is classified as least concern on the IUCN Red List (v3.1, 2007). Species are listed as such due to their wide distribution, presumed large population, or because they are unlikely to be declining fast enough to qualify for listing in a more threatened category. When last assessed in 2007, the population trend was stable.

Constant persecution of the species and drainage of wetland habitat prior to development has taken a heavy toll on local populations. Despite this, it remains a common species in many areas. One reason cottonmouths are hunted is for their skin, which is often used as a form of leather.

In Indiana, the cottonmouth is listed as an endangered species.
