= Theodorus Willem van Lidth de Jeude =

Dutch zoologist and herpetologist

Theodorus Willem van Lidth de Jeude (1 February 1853 – 29 May 1937) was a Dutch zoologist and herpetologist. He is not to be confused with his grandfather's brother, the Dutch veterinarian and zoologist Theodoor Gerard van Lidth de Jeude (1788–1863).

== Life and career ==
T.W. van Lidth de Jeude was born on 1 February 1853 in Helmond, about 15 km east of Eindhoven. He attended the University of Utrecht where his grandfather, T.G. van Lidth de Jeude, taught zoology and veterinary science. Theorodus Willem received his Ph.D. in 1882 for a thesis on coleopteran larvae. Between 1882 and 1884 he studied fishes in Naples and at Kralingen (near Rotterdam). In 1884, he became curator of Lower Vertebrates at the Rijksmuseum in Leiden. He retired from his curatorship in 1923 but kept working at the museum until 1931. T.W. von Lidth de Jeude died in Leiden on 29 May 1937.

== Species described ==
Lidth de Jeude described many species, e.g. 23 species of reptiles that are still recognized today, including

- Anomochilus weberi (LIDTH DE JEUDE 1890)
- Aphaniotis ornata (LIDTH DE JEUDE 1893)
- Arthrosaura kockii (LIDTH DE JEUDE 1904)
- Arthrosaura versteegii (LIDTH DE JEUDE 1904)
- Asthenodipsas tropidonotus (LIDTH DE JEUDE 1923)
- Calamaria crassa (LIDTH DE JEUDE 1922)
- Calamaria prakkei (LIDTH DE JEUDE 1893)
- Cnemidophorus arubensis (LIDTH DE JEUDE 1887)
- Dendrelaphis lorentzi (LIDTH DE JEUDE 1911)
- Dopasia buettikoferi (LIDTH DE JEUDE 1905)
- Eremiascincus emigrans (LIDTH DE JEUDE 1895)
- Gonatodes antillensis (LIDTH DE JEUDE 1887)
- Hemidactylus tenkatei (LIDTH DE JEUDE 1895)
- Lamprolepis nieuwenhuisii (LIDTH DE JEUDE 1905)
- Opisthotropis rugosa (LIDTH DE JEUDE 1890)
- Phyllodactylus martini (LIDTH DE JEUDE 1887)
- Sphenomorphus buettikoferi (LIDTH DE JEUDE 1905)
- Trimeresurus hageni (LIDTH DE JEUDE 1886)
- Tropidonophis montanus (LIDTH DE JEUDE 1911)
- Tropidonophis novaeguineae (LIDTH DE JEUDE 1911)
- Tropidophorus iniquus (LIDTH DE JEUDE 1905)
- Tropidophorus micropus (LIDTH DE JEUDE 1905)
- Tytthoscincus hallieri (LIDTH DE JEUDE 1905)
