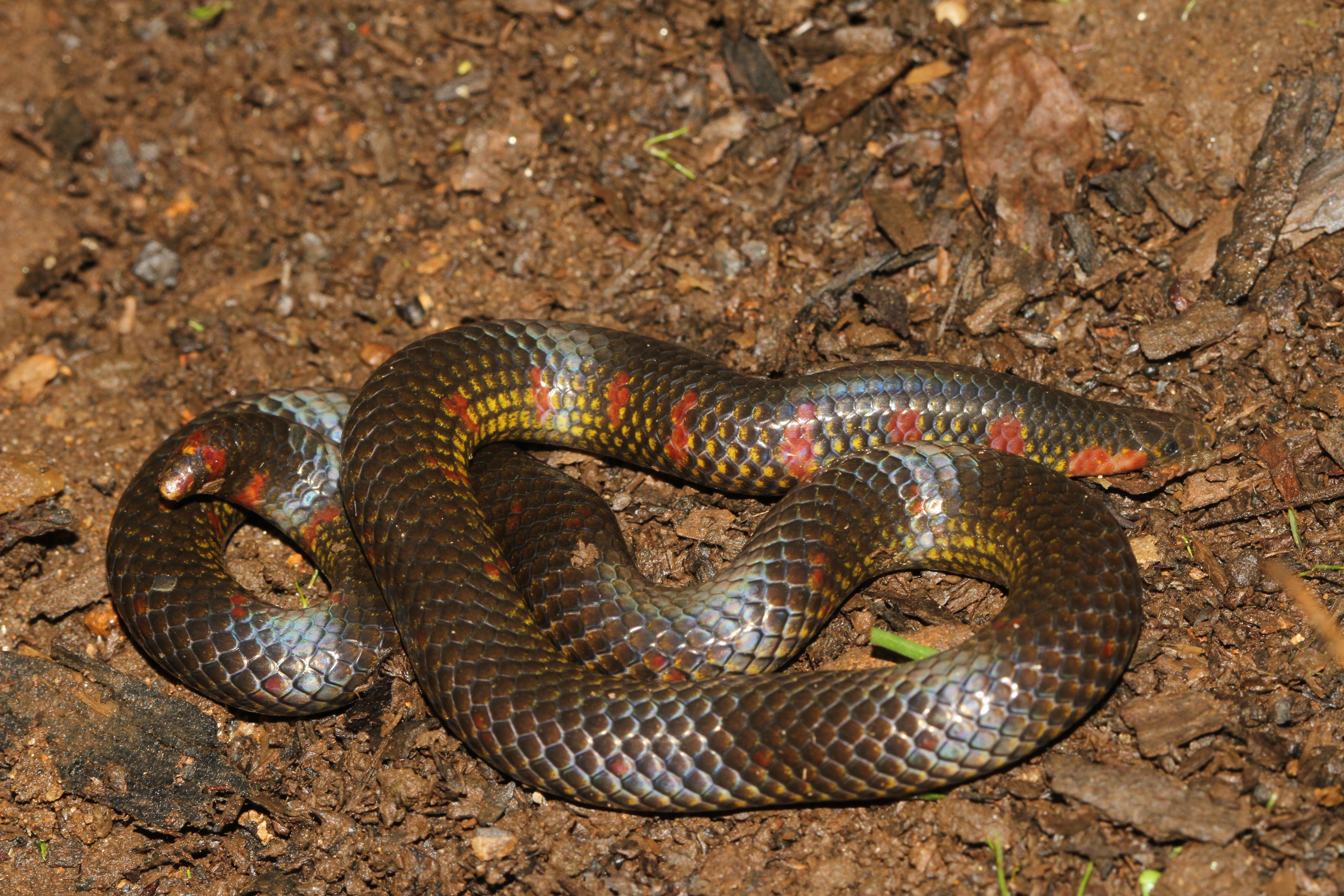
- Uropeltis maculata (Uropeltidae)
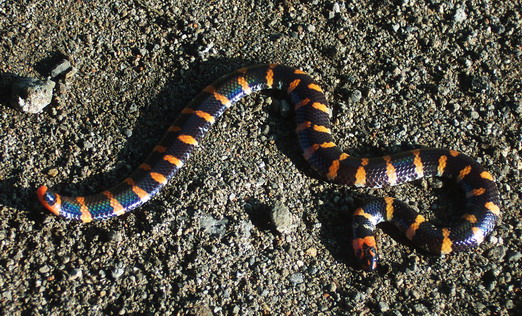
- Cylindrophis rufus (Cylindrophiidae)

Scientific classification
- Kingdom: Animalia
- Phylum: Chordata
- Class: Reptilia
- Order: Squamata
- Suborder: Serpentes
- Infraorder: Alethinophidia
- Superfamily: Uropeltoidea; J.P. Müller, 1832

Families
- Uropeltidae; Cylindrophiidae; Anomochilidae

= Uropeltoidea =

Superfamily of snakes

The Uropeltoidea, also known as uropeltoid snakes, are a superfamily of snakes that contains uropeltids (family Uropeltidae) and Asian pipesnakes (families Cylindrophiidae and Anomochilidae).

As of 2018, Uropeltoidea contains 97 species, including the eponymous shield-tail snakes (genus Uropeltis with 26 species) and their relatives (68 species in six other genera), 14 species of Asian pipesnakes (genus Cylindrophis), and three species of dwarf pipesnakes (genus Anomochilus).

The taxonomy of boas, pythons, and other henophidian snakes has long been debated, and ultimately the decision whether to assign a particular clade to a particular Linnaean rank (such as a superfamily, family, or subfamily) is arbitrary. The clade name Uropeltoidea emphasizes the relatively close evolutionary relationship among these 71 species, which last shared a common ancestor about 48 [CI:36–60] million years ago, in contrast to the more distant relationship between uropeltoids and their next closest relatives, pythonoids (the most recent common ancestor between uropeltoids and pythonoids lived ~73 [CI:59–87] million years ago).
