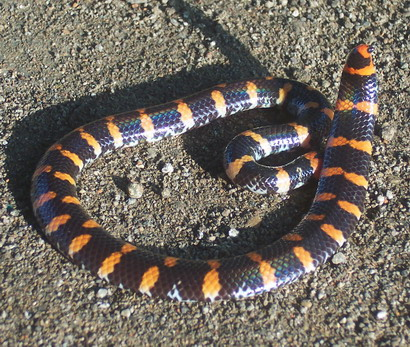

Conservation status
- Least Concern (IUCN 3.1)

Scientific classification
- Kingdom: Animalia
- Phylum: Chordata
- Class: Reptilia
- Order: Squamata
- Suborder: Serpentes
- Family: Cylindrophiidae
- Genus: Cylindrophis
- Species: C. ruffus

Binomial name
- Cylindrophis ruffus (Laurenti, 1768)

Synonyms
- Anguis ruffa Laurenti, 1768; [Anguis] rufus - Gmelin, 1788; [Anguis] striatus Gmelin, 1788; Eryx rufus - Daudin, 1803; [Tortrix] rufa - Merrem, 1820; [Scytale] Schuechzeri Merrem, 1820; A[guis]. (E[lysia].) rufus - Hemprich, 1820; Ilysia rufa - Lichtenstein, 1823; Cylindrophis resplendens Wagler, 1828; [Tortrix] rufus - Gray, 1831; Cylindrophis rufa - Gray, 1842; Cylindrophis rufus - Cantor, 1847; Anguis rubra - Gray, 1849; Anguis rufa Var. Javanica Gray, 1849; Cylindrophis rufus - Boulenger, 1893; Cylindrophis rufus rufus - M.A. Smith, 1943; Cylindrophis rufus burmanus M.A. Smith, 1943; Cylindrophis rufus - Campden-Main, 1970

= Cylindrophis ruffus =

Species of snake

The red-tailed pipe snake, red cylinder snake, or common pipe snake (Cylindrophis ruffus) is a nonvenomous cylindrophiid snake species found in Southeast Asia. No subspecies are currently recognized.

== Description ==
Adults can grow to 39 in (1 m) in length.

The dorsal scales are smooth, in 19 or 21 rows, with 186–245 ventrals, which are not quite twice as large as the contiguous dorsal scales; the anal plate is divided, and five to 10 subcaudals.

Compared to other snakes, C. ruffus have a limited gape size. Their primary diet consists of long, thin prey animals including snakes, caecilians, and eels.

== Geographic range ==
It is found in Myanmar and southern China (Fujian, Hong Kong and on Hainan Island), south into Vietnam, Laos, Cambodia, Thailand, the Malay Peninsula and the East Indies to Indonesia (the Riau Archipelago, Sumatra, Bangka, Borneo, Java, Sulawesi, Buton and the Sula Islands. The type locality given is "Surinami" (possibly a mistake).
