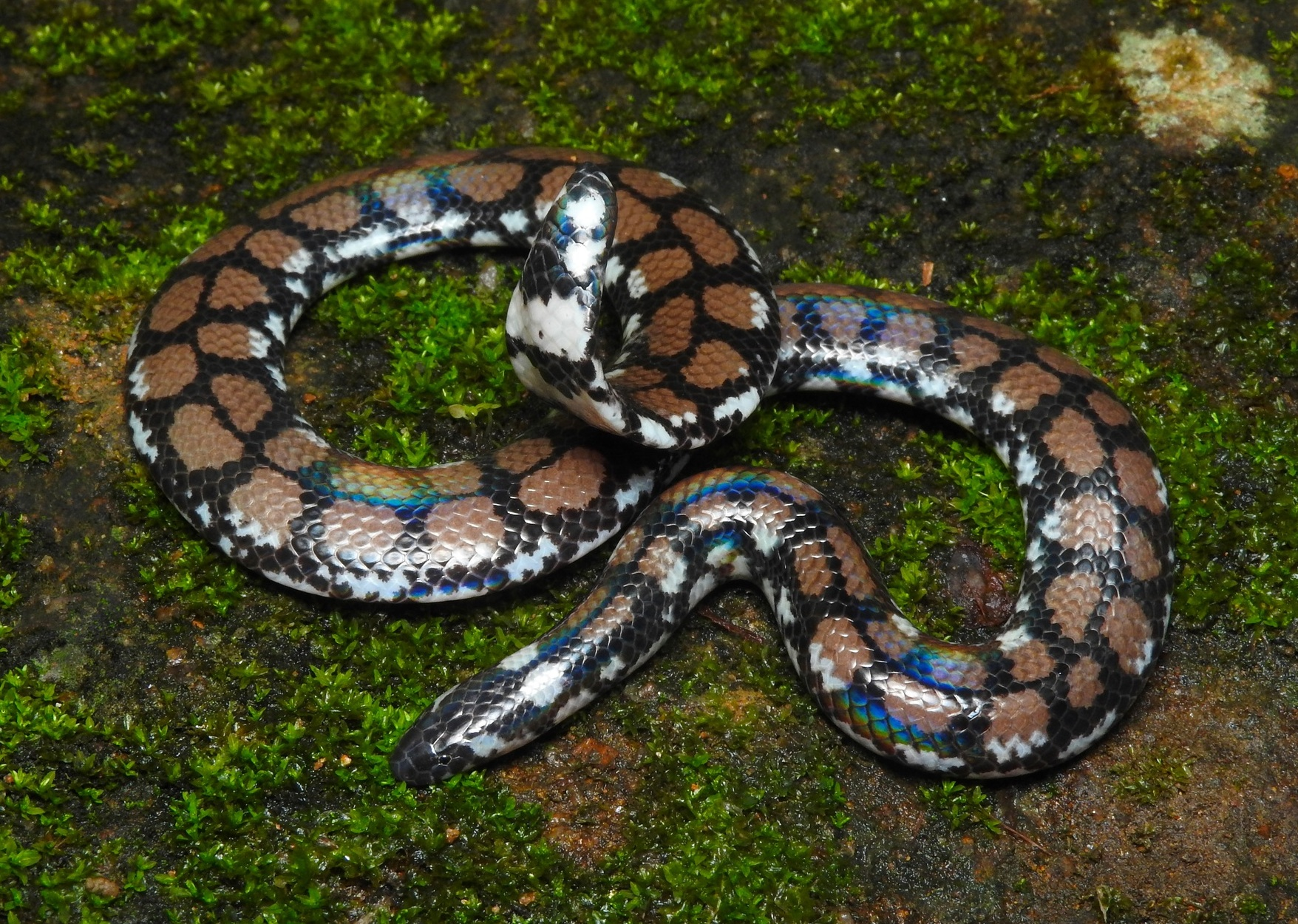
- C. maculatus

Scientific classification
- Kingdom: Animalia
- Phylum: Chordata
- Class: Reptilia
- Order: Squamata
- Suborder: Serpentes
- Superfamily: Booidea
- Family: Cylindrophiidae; Fitzinger, 1843
- Genus: Cylindrophis; Wagler, 1828

Synonyms
- Cylindrophes Fitzinger, 1843; Tortricidae Jan, 1863; Aniliidae Stejneger, 1907; Cylindrophinae McDowell, 1975; Cylindropheinae McDowell, 1975; Cylindrophiidae Cundall, Wallach & Rossman, 1993

= Cylindrophis =

Family of non-venomous snakes

The Cylindrophiidae are a monotypic family of secretive, semifossorial, non-venomous snakes containing the genus Cylindrophis found in southeastern Asia. These are burrowing snakes and most have a banded pattern on the belly. Currently, 14 species are recognized, all with no subspecies. Common names include Asian pipesnakes and Asian cylinder snakes.

== Geographic range ==
Cylindrophis are found in southeastern Asia from Myanmar, Laos, Vietnam, Cambodia, Thailand, and the Malay Archipelago, including Singapore, both peninsular Malaysia and Sarawak, and Indonesia, including the Greater Sunda Islands (Borneo [including Sarawak and Brunei]), Sumatra, and Java, as well as some of their offshore islands), Sulawesi, the Lesser Sunda Islands (Lombok, Komodo, Flores, Sumbawa, Timor [including Timor-Leste]), and east to the Maluku Islands (Halmahera, Wetar, Damar, Babar, and into the Tanimbar Archipelago). The eastern distributional limit, sometimes given as the Aru Islands off the southwestern coast of New Guinea, is questionable. They are also found in Sri Lanka (but not India) and in southeastern China (Fujian, Hong Kong, and on Hainan Island).

== Description ==
All members of the genus Cylindrophis share the following five characteristics: 1) a relatively blunt head, not distinct from the neck, with minute eyes and a mental groove; 2) the absence of well-developed ventral scales, with ventral scales only slightly larger than or equal in size to the dorsal scales; (3) the presence of a pair of pelvic spurs in both sexes; (4) a very short tail, often with conspicuous ventral coloration; and (5) contrasting light and dark ventral blotching.

The body is cylindrical, with a near-uniform diameter, which leads to the name "pipe snakes". All species are small- to medium-sized, with total lengths ranging from 12.5 cm (5 inches) to 85.7 cm (34 inches).

The teeth are moderate and subequal, with 10–12 in each maxilla and none in the premaxilla. There are no fangs and no evidence of venom. The eyes have round or vertically subelliptic pupils. The head has large symmetrical shields, with the nostrils in a single nasal, which forms a suture with its fellow behind the rostral. Loreal scale is present, and a small postocular scale is present. The dorsal scales are smooth, in 17, 19, 21, or 23 rows depending on the species.

== Behavior and ecology ==
When threatened, Cylindrophis flatten the posterior portion of their body and arch it above the ground to display their conspicuous ventral pattern, while the head remains concealed among the body coils. Only one species, C. yamdena, lacks a bold ventral pattern in most individuals, having instead an orange-pink belly without bands or spots.

Little is known of the foraging or mating behavior of Cylindrophis. At least one species uses constriction to subdue its prey, which include elongate vertebrates: reptiles (snakes), amphibians (caecilians), and fish (eels). Prey are swallowed from one end using rotational movements of the braincase and mandibles, a process that takes up to 30 minutes for larger prey. This is distinct from the 'pterygoid walk' used by most other species of alethinophidian snakes, which have greater mobility of most skull bones than Cylindrophis.

== Species ==
The genus Cylindrophis contains the following 14 species.

Species	Taxon author	Common name	Geographic range
C. aruensis	Boulenger, 1920	Aru cylinder snake	Indonesia: The Aru Islands
C. boulengeri	Roux, 1911	Boulenger's pipesnake	Indonesia: the islands of Babar, Timor, and Wetar, and Timor-Leste
C. burmanus	Smith, 1943	Burmese pipesnake	Myanmar
C. engkariensis	Stuebing, 1994	Engkari pipesnake	Malaysia: Borneo (Sarawak)
C. isolepis	Boulenger, 1896	Jampea Island pipesnake	Indonesia: Jampea Island
C. jodiae	Amarasinghe, Ineich, Campbell, & Hallermann, 2015	Jodi's pipesnake	central Vietnam, China
C. lineatus	Dennys, 1880	Blanford's pipesnake	Indonesia: Borneo, and Malaysia: Sarawak
C. maculatus	(Linnaeus, 1758)	Ceylonese cylinder snake	Sri Lanka
C. melanotus	Wagler, 1828	black pipesnake	Indonesia: Sulawesi (Celebes), the Tabukan Islands, the Sangihe Islands, the Sula Islands, Halmahera and Batjan
C. opisthorhodus	Boulenger, 1897	island pipesnake	Indonesia: Lombok, Sumbawa, Komodo and Flores.
C. osheai	Kieckbusch, Mader, Kaiser, & Mecke, 2018	O'Shea's pipesnake or Boano pipesnake	Indonesia: Boano
C. ruffus^{T}	(Laurenti, 1768)	red-tailed pipesnake	Myanmar and southern China (Fujian, Hong Kong and on Hainan Island), south into Vietnam, Laos, Cambodia, Thailand, the Malay Peninsula and the East Indies to Indonesia (the Riau Archipelago, Sumatra, Bangka, Borneo, Java, Sulawesi, Buton and the Sula Islands)
C. slowinskii	Bernstein, Bauer, McGuire, Arida, Kaiser, Kieckbusch, & Mecke, 2020	Slowinski's pipesnake	Myanmar: Kachin state
C. subocularis	Kieckbusch, Mecke, Hartmann, Ehrmantraut, O'Shea, & Kaiser, 2016		Indonesia: south-central Java
C. yamdena	Smith & Sidik, 1998	Yamdena pipesnake	Indonesia: Yamdena Island

^{T:} Type species.

== Phylogenetic relationships ==
Many recent studies based on molecular data suggest that Cylindrophiidae may be paraphyletic with respect to another family of pipesnakes, Anomochilidae or dwarf pipesnakes. Probably this will be resolved by including Anomochilidae within Cylindrophiidae in the future, but as of May 2018 no formal proposal to do so has been made.

In a broader sense, Cylindrophiidae & Anomochilidae are most closely related to Uropeltidae, a family of burrowing snakes from southern India & Sri Lanka. These three families are together called the Uropeltoidea and probably last shared a common ancestor in the Eocene, about 45 million years ago. Uropeltoids are probably most closely related to pythonoids, and then to booids. These three groups probably last shared a common ancestor in the late Cretaceous, about 75 million years ago.
