= Mental groove =

Longitudinal Groove

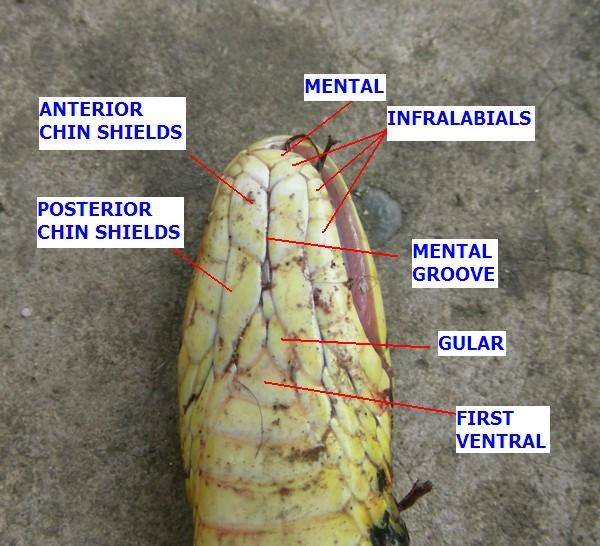
Mental groove indicated with its relationships to other scales

Most snakes have a longitudinal groove on the underside of the head between large, paired chin shields and smaller gular scales. This is referred to as Mental groove.

== See also ==
- Snake scales
- Gular scales
