= Parietal scales =

Snake head scales connected to frontals to posterior

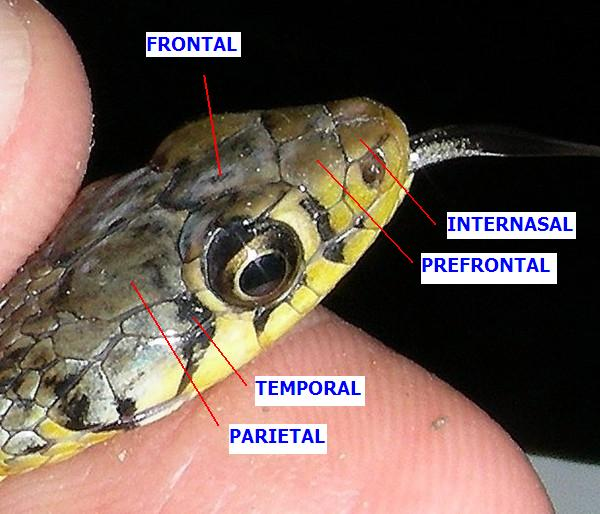
Nomenclature of scales (top view of head)

Parietal scales are the scales of a snake located on the snake's head and are connected to the frontals towards the posterior. These plate-like scales are analogous to and take their name from the parietal bone, which forms the roof and sides of the cranium in humans.

== See also ==
- Parietal bone
- Snake scales
- Anatomical terms of location
