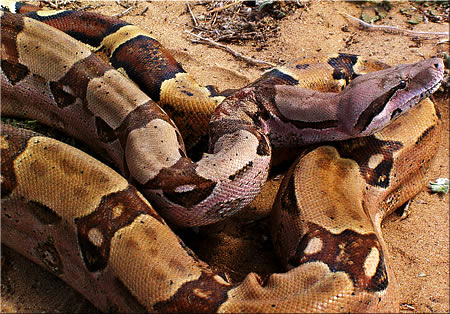
- Boa (Boa constrictor)
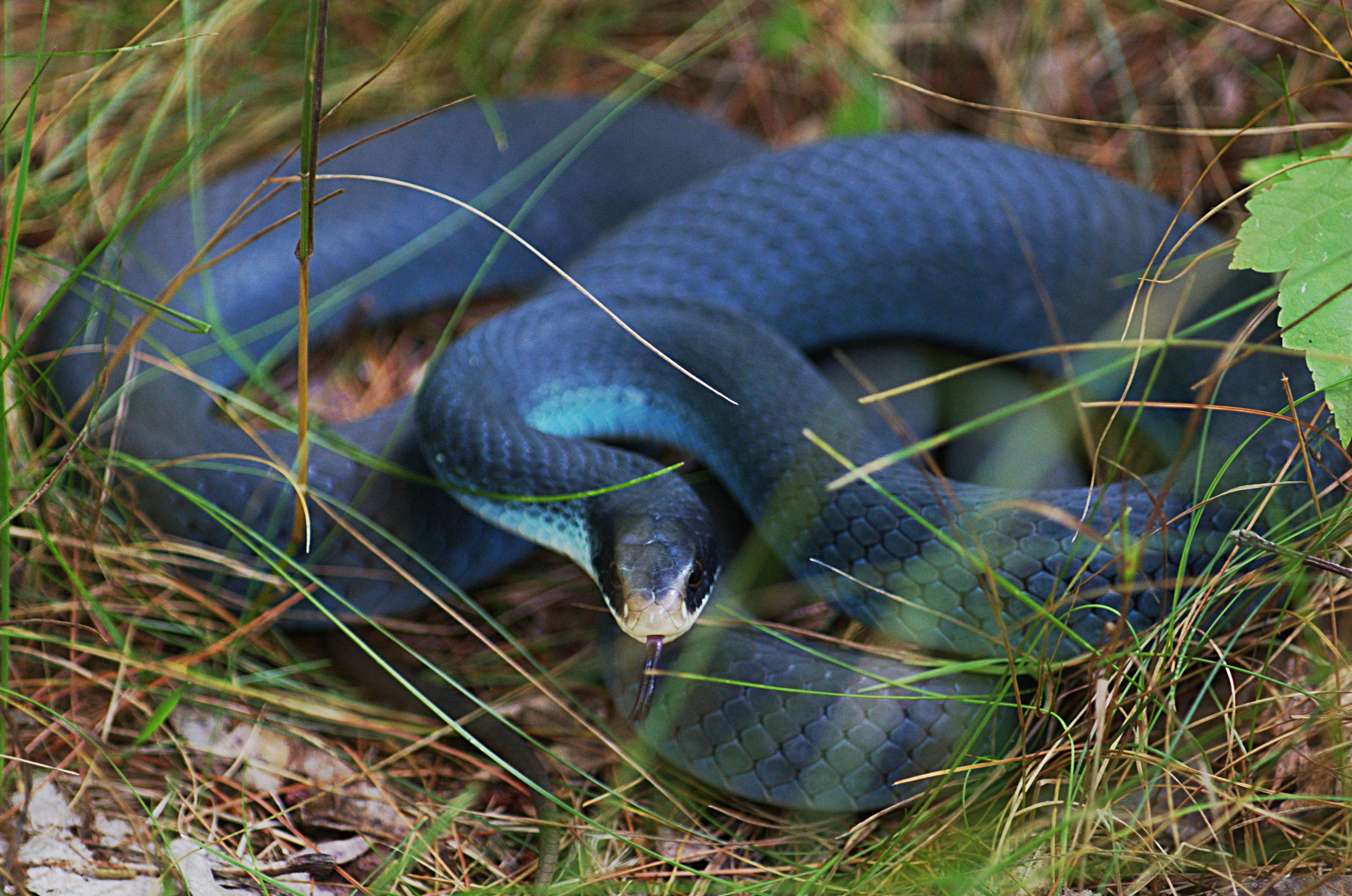
- Eastern racer (Coluber constrictor)

Scientific classification
- Kingdom: Animalia
- Phylum: Chordata
- Class: Reptilia
- Order: Squamata
- Suborder: Serpentes
- Infraorder: Alethinophidia
- Clade: Afrophidia; Vidal, Delmas & Hedges, 2007

Subclades
- Henophidia; Caenophidia

= Afrophidia =

Afrophidia Temporal range: 84.9–0 Ma Late Cretaceous to Present

Clade of snakes comprising large and venomous species

Afrophidia is a clade of alethinophidian snakes comprising the groups Henophidia and Caenophidia, and contains many of the most familiar and well-known snakes. The name refers to the deep split between Afrophidia and their sister taxon, Amerophidia, which originated in South America, and the afrophidians. This has been hypothesized to represent a vicariance event related to the breakup of Gondwanan South America and Africa.

Unlike the scolecophidians and amerophidians, which have evolved to be small, the afrophidians have evolved many larger species. This is also the group in which venom has been developed in several lines of snakes.

Below is a phylogeny of Afrophidia recovered from numerous phylogenetic work on snakes:

- Afrophidia
  - - Henophidia
      - - Uropeltoidea
          - Uropeltidae
          - - Cylindrophiidae
            - Anomochilidae
        - Pythonoidea
          - Xenopeltidae
          - - Loxocemidae
            - Pythonidae
      - - Booidea
          - - Calabariidae
            - Sanziniidae
          - - Charinidae*
              - Charininae
              - Ungaliophiinae
            - - Erycidae
              - - Candoiidae
                - Boidae
  - - Bolyerioidea
      - Xenophidiidae
      - Bolyeriidae
    - Caenophidia
      - - †Anomalophioidea
          †Anomalophiidae
      - - - †Russellophioidea
            †Russellophiidae
        - - Acrochordoidea
            - †Nigerophiidae
            - - Acrochordidae
              - - †Palaeophiidae
                  - †Archaeophinae
                  - †Palaeophiinae
          - Colubroides
            - Xenodermidae
            - Colubriformes
              - - Pareidae
                  - Pareinae
                  - Xylophiinae
              - - - Viperidae
                    - Viperinae
                    - - Azemiopinae
                      - Crotalinae
                - - Homalopsidae
                  - - Elapoidea
                      - Prosymnidae
                      - - Buhoma
                        - - - Psammophiidae
                              - Pseudaspidinae
                              - Psammophiinae
                          - - - - Lamprophiidae
                                  - Pseudoxyrhophiinae
                                  - - Micrelapiinae
                                    - - Psammodynastiinae
                                      - Lamprophiinae
                              - - Elapidae
                                  - Calliophiinae
                                  - - Micrurinae
                                    - - Naja
                                      - - Bungarinae
                                        - - Elapsoidea
                                          - Hydrophiinae
                                - Atractaspididae
                                  - Cyclocorinae
                                  - Atractaspidinae
                    - Colubroidea
                      - Colubridae
                        - - Grayiinae
                          - Calamariinae
                        - - Ahaetuliinae
                          - Colubrinae
                      - - - Sibynophiidae
                          - Natricidae
                        - - Pseudoxenodontidae
                          - - Dipsadidae
                              - Carphophiinae
                              - - Xenodontinae
                                - Dipsadinae

Venomous
