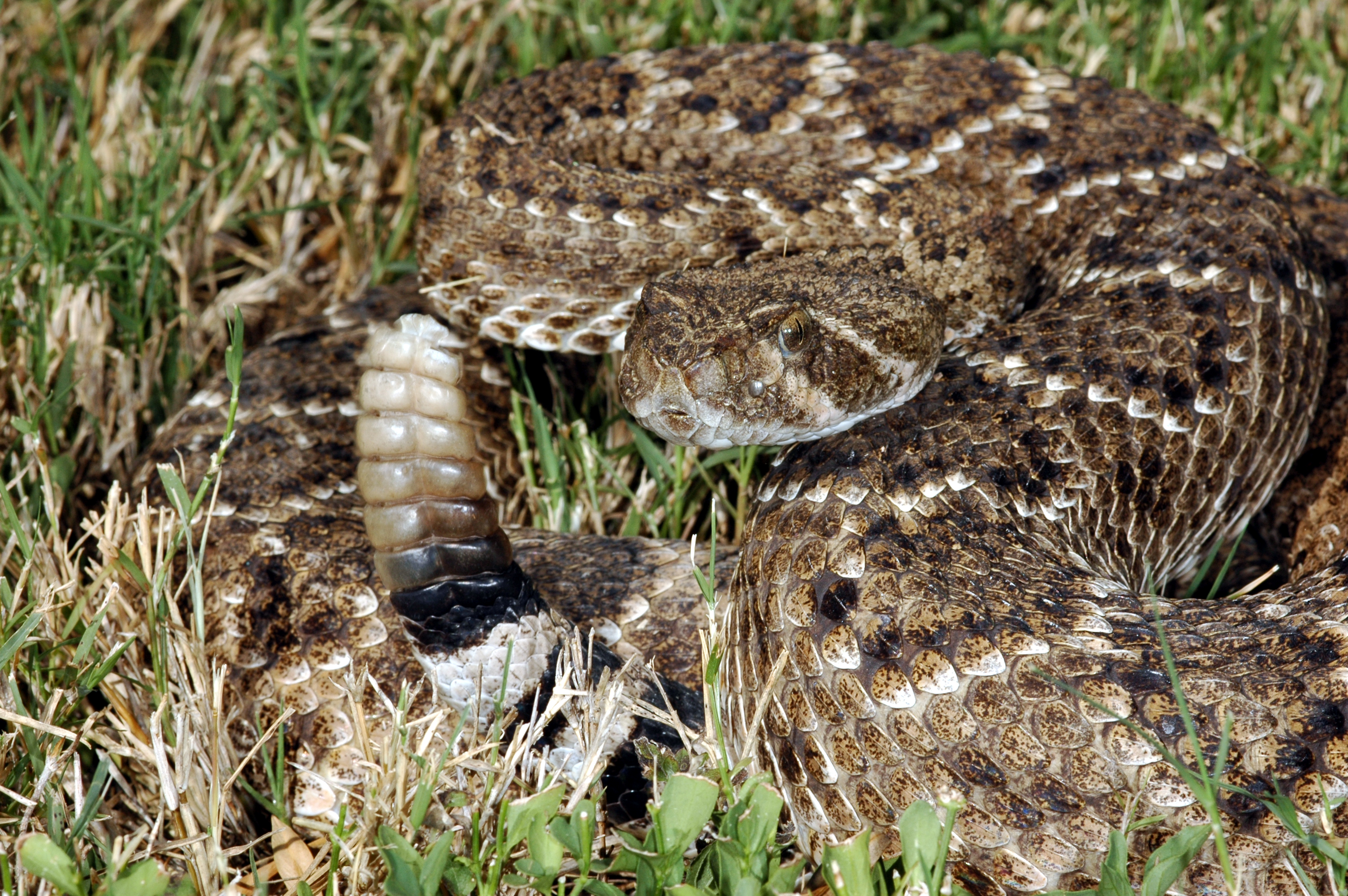
- Western diamondback rattlesnake (Crotalus atrox)

Scientific classification
- Kingdom: Animalia
- Phylum: Chordata
- Class: Reptilia
- Order: Squamata
- Suborder: Serpentes
- Clade: Afrophidia
- Clade: Caenophidia; Hoffstetter, 1939

Subclades
- †Anomalophioidea; †Russellophioidea; Acrochordoidea; Colubroides

Synonyms
- Xenophidia

= Caenophidia =

Caenophidia Temporal range: 84.9–0 Ma Late Cretaceous to Present

Clade of snakes

The Caenophidia are a derived clade of alethinophidian snakes, which contains over 80% of all the extant species of snakes. The largest family is Colubridae, but it also includes at least seven other families, at least four of which were once classified as "Colubridae" before molecular phylogenetics helped us understand their relationships. It has been found to be monophyletic.

Although the Caenophidia previously was held to exclude Acrochordidae, researchers have recognized that acrochordids share several traits with the other caenophidians. Hence Caenophidia is usually considered to comprise Acrochordidae plus the more derived snakes classified as Colubroidea. Recent molecular studies have also found the families Xenophidiidae and Bolyeriidae to be closely related to caenophidians, forming the sister group to Caenophidia rather than being part of Henophidia.

Below is a phylogeny of the Caenophidia based on analyses from several studies:

- - Bolyerioidea
    - Xenophidiidae
    - Bolyeriidae
  - Caenophidia
    - - †Anomalophiidae
    - - - †Russellophiidae
      - - Acrochordoidea
          - †Nigerophiidae
          - - Acrochordidae
            - - †Palaeophiidae
                - †Archaeophinae
                - †Palaeophiinae
        - Colubroides
          - - Xenodermidae
          - Colubriformes
            - - Pareidae
                - Pareinae
                - Xylophiinae
            - - - Viperidae
                  - Viperinae
                  - - Azemiopinae
                    - Crotalinae
              - Endoglyptodonta
                - - Homalopsidae
                - - Elapoidea
                    - Prosymnidae
                    - - Buhoma
                      - - - Psammophiidae
                            - Pseudaspidinae
                            - Psammophiinae
                        - - - - Lamprophiidae
                                - Pseudoxyrhophiinae
                                - - Micrelapiinae
                                  - - Psammodynastiinae
                                    - Lamprophiinae
                            - - Elapidae
                                - Calliophiinae
                                - - Micrurinae
                                  - - Najinae Naja
                                    - - Bungarinae
                                      - - Elapsoidea
                                        - Hydrophiinae
                              - Atractaspididae
                                - Cyclocorinae
                                - Atractaspidinae
                  - Colubroidea
                    - Colubridae
                      - - Grayiinae
                        - Calamariinae
                      - - Ahaetuliinae
                        - Colubrinae
                    - - - Sibynophiidae
                        - Natricidae
                      - - Pseudoxenodontidae
                        - - Dipsadidae
                            - Carphophiinae Carphophis
                            - - Xenodontinae
                              - Dipsadinae
