= Templer Park =

Forest reserve in Gombak, Selangor, Malaysia

Templer Park Hutan Lipur Templer
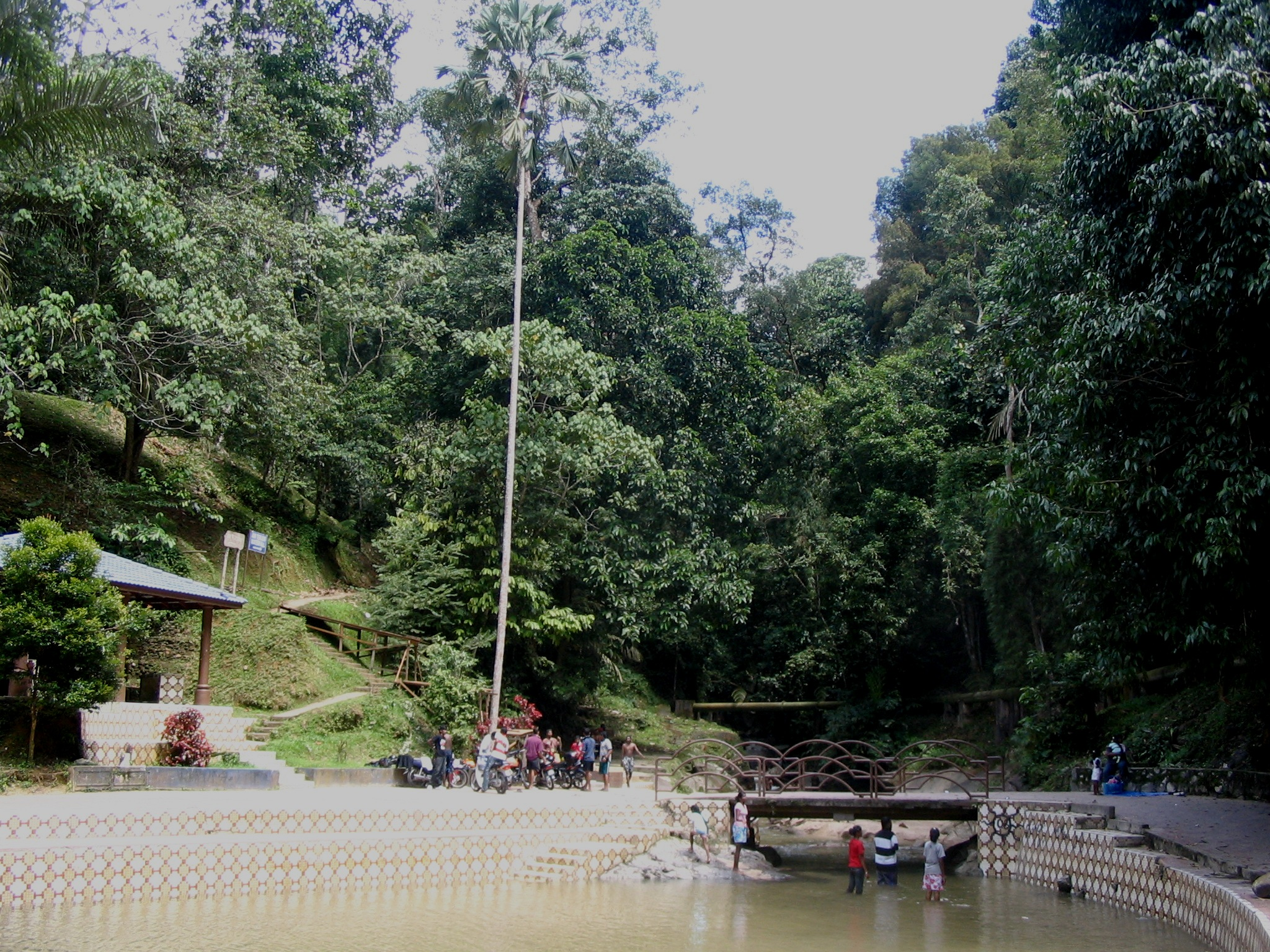
- Interactive map of Templer Park; Hutan Lipur Templer
- Type: Forest reserve
- Location: Rawang, Gombak, Selangor, Malaysia
- Coordinates: 3.2863296°N 101.6423534°E
- Area: 1,214 hectares (3,000 acres)
- Created: 8 September 1954

Templer Park (Malay: Hutan Lipur Templer) is a forest reserve in Rawang, Gombak District, Selangor, Malaysia. The 1,214-hectare forest reserve was named after Sir Gerald Templer, a British High Commissioner in Malaya. "On 8 September 1954, His Highness the Sultan of Selangor, the late Sultan Hishamuddin Alam Shah declared that Templer’s Park was 'dedicated by Selangor to serve as a refuge and a sanctuary for wildlife and a meeting-place for all who love and respect the beauty of nature'. The following year the government gazetted the area as “a Botanical Garden and Public Park” under the land enactment (Notification 104–1955)".

This forest reserve consists of multi-tiered waterfalls, jungle streams and trails. Several amenities are available in this forest reserve, such as picnic grounds, fishing spots, parking lots, public toilets and stalls.

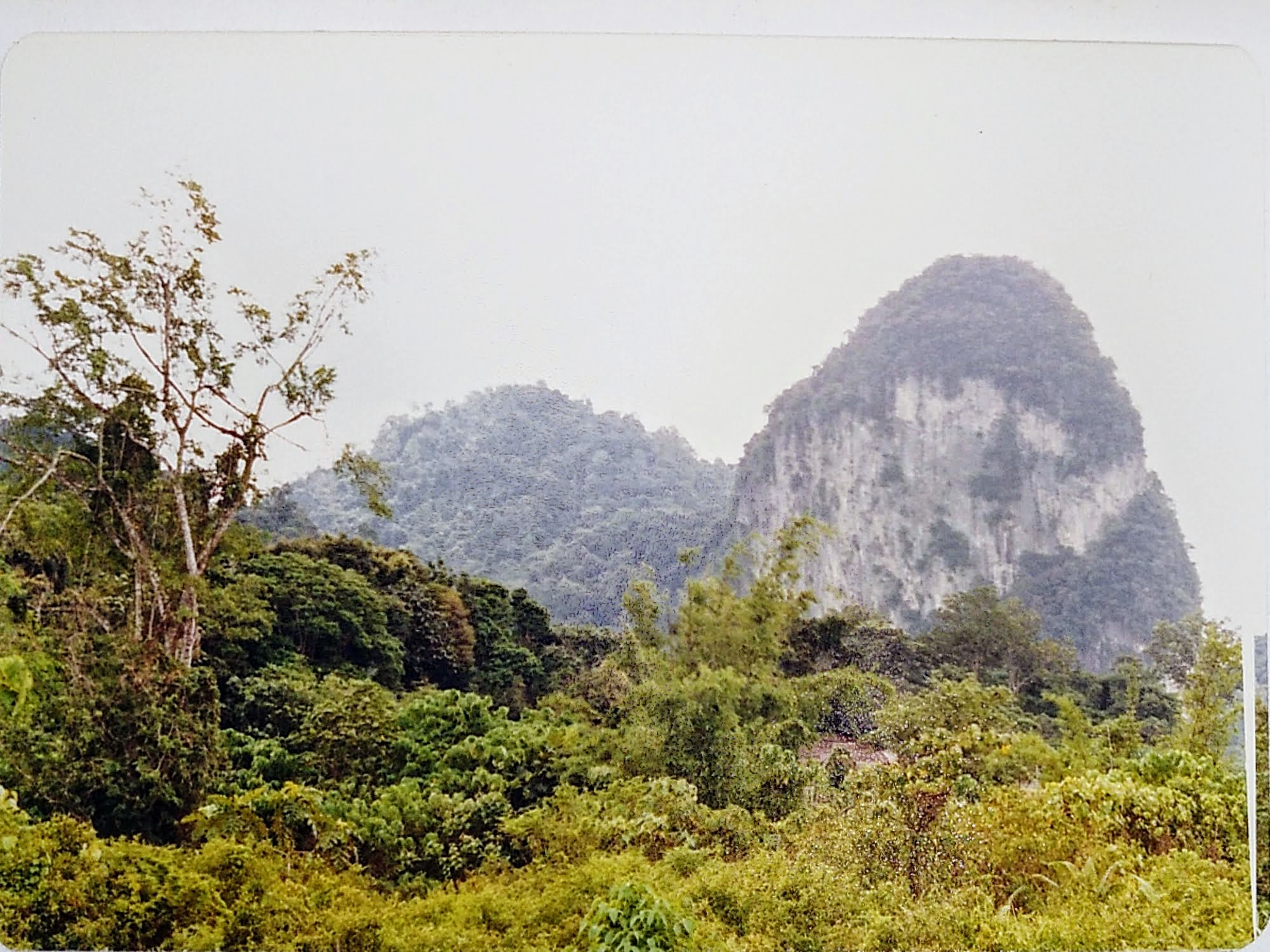
Templer Park in Rawang, Gombak District, Selangor, Malaysia 1986

Wildlife that can be spotted in Templer's Park include the park monkey, the hawk-cuckoo, the crested serpent eagle, the emerald dove, the forest wagtail, malkohas, the barbet, the woodpecker, the flycatcher-shrike, the blue-winged leafbird, the earless agamid, the Malaysian crested lizard, various kinds of toads and snakes and serow (goat-antelopes). Studies by Malaysian Nature Society have confirmed that there is still a population of serow living in the vicinity. The cave, Gua Anak Takun, is home to a rare species of trapdoor spider, Liphistius batuensis.

Templar Park is the type locality where the holotype of the Malaysian spine-jawed snake Xenophidion schaeferi was collected in 1988. To date this is the only known specimen of this rare snake, which belongs in the obscure and primitive snake family Xenophidiidae. The family contains only one other species, X. acanthognathus, also only known from its holotype, which was collected in Sabah, northeast Borneo. These snakes are harmless, nonvenomous, and thought to feed on earthworms or insect larvae.

== Threats from development ==
Templer's Park faces threat from housing and road development. Land adjacent to the park on former parkland has been sold to private interests. Developments such as T-Parkland@Templer's Park by the company MCT involved the construction of high-end residences, a 17-story tower block and golf courses. In addition, currently some 50 hectares have been cleared for a road and more residences. This activity had the consent of the local planning authorities, where the site sign carried the license number 'US HS 3 2012 BALAK'.

== Accessibility ==
Templer's Park can be accessed from the Rawang exit of the North–South Expressway. The park can also be reached by taking the No 66 bus from Puduraya in Kuala Lumpur.

== Incidents ==
In 2008, a Danish man went missing for 12 hours in Templer's Park before finding his way out of the jungle. He went missing at an altitude of 500 feet above sea level.
