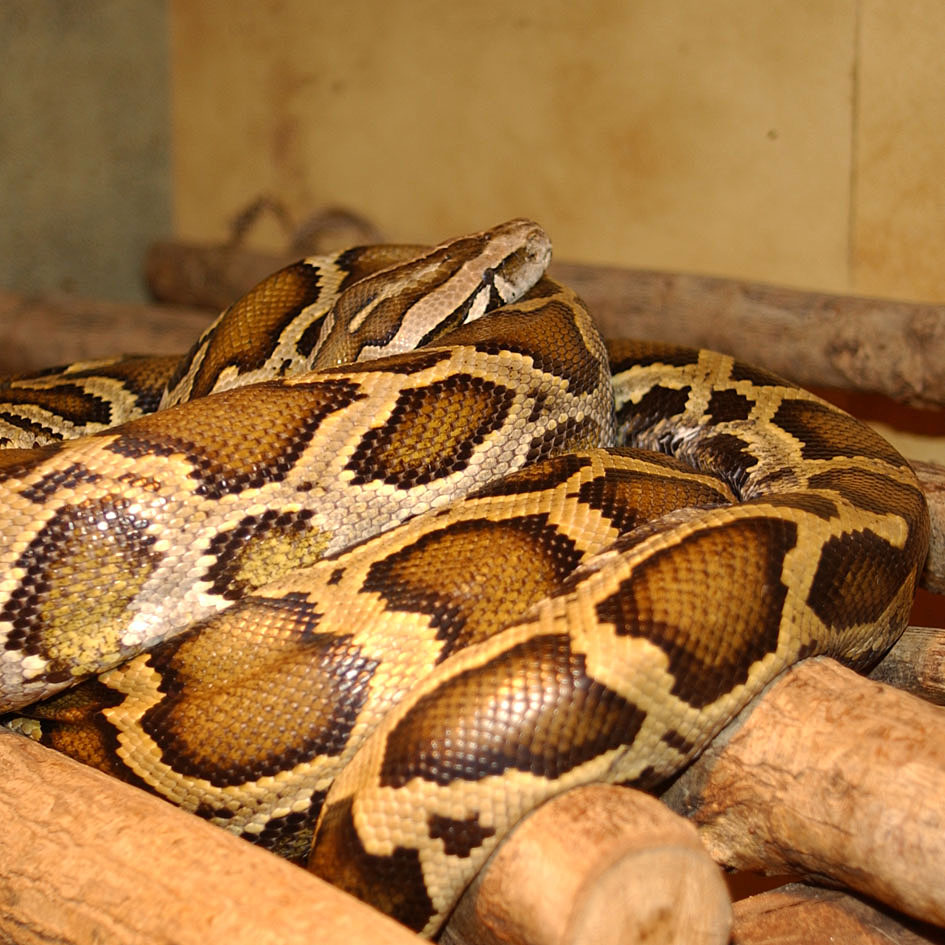
- Burmese python, Python bivittatus

Scientific classification
- Kingdom: Animalia
- Phylum: Chordata
- Class: Reptilia
- Order: Squamata
- Suborder: Serpentes
- Clade: Afrophidia
- Informal group: Henophidia

= Henophidia =

Group of snakes

Henophidia is a former parvorder of the suborder Serpentes (snakes) that contains boas, pythons and numerous other less-well-known snakes.

Snakes once considered to belong to superfamily Henophidia include two families now considered Amerophidia (Aniliidae – red pipe snakes, and Tropidophiidae – dwarf "boas" or thunder snakes), three families now considered Uropeltoidea (Cylindrophiidae – Asian pipe snakes, Anomochilidae – dwarf pipe snakes, and Uropeltidae – shield-tailed snakes and short-tailed snakes), three families now considered Pythonoidea (Pythonidae – pythons, Loxocemidae – Mexican burrowing snake, and Xenopeltidae – sunbeam snakes), at least one family now considered Booidea (Boidae – boas [including sand boas and many other lineages often called boas, mostly now considered subfamilies of Boidae]), and Bolyeriidae – Round Island splitjaw snakes.

Because these snakes do not form a monophyletic group they can no longer be formally referred to using a single name. In modern usage, "Henophidia" is often placed in quotes, because it can be convenient to refer to all lineages that used to be considered Henophidia. Another way of thinking about it is that "henophidian" snakes are all snakes that are not Scolecophidia (blindsnakes) or Caenophidia (so-called "advanced snakes"). "Henophidian" snakes are sometimes said to be more "basal" or "primitive" than those belonging to the Caenophidia, but this does not mean that they are inferior or that they have evolved less, rather that we think they share more traits with their common ancestor in comparison to the Caenophidia.

== Etymology ==
Henophidia comes from the Greek heno- meaning one or former and ophidia meaning serpent, so former/older snakes (in contrast to Caenophidia, i.e. recent snakes).

== Former families ==
- Aniliidae – coral pipe snakes and pipe snakes.
- Anomochilidae – dwarf pipe snakes.
- Boidae – boas (including sand boas)
- Bolyeriidae – Round Island boas.
- Cylindrophiidae – Asian pipe snakes.
- Loxocemidae – Mexican burrowing snake.
- Pythonidae – pythons
- Tropidophiidae – dwarf boas.
- Uropeltidae – shield-tailed snakes and short-tail snakes.
- Xenopeltidae – sunbeam snakes.
- Xenophidiidae - spine-jawed snakes.
