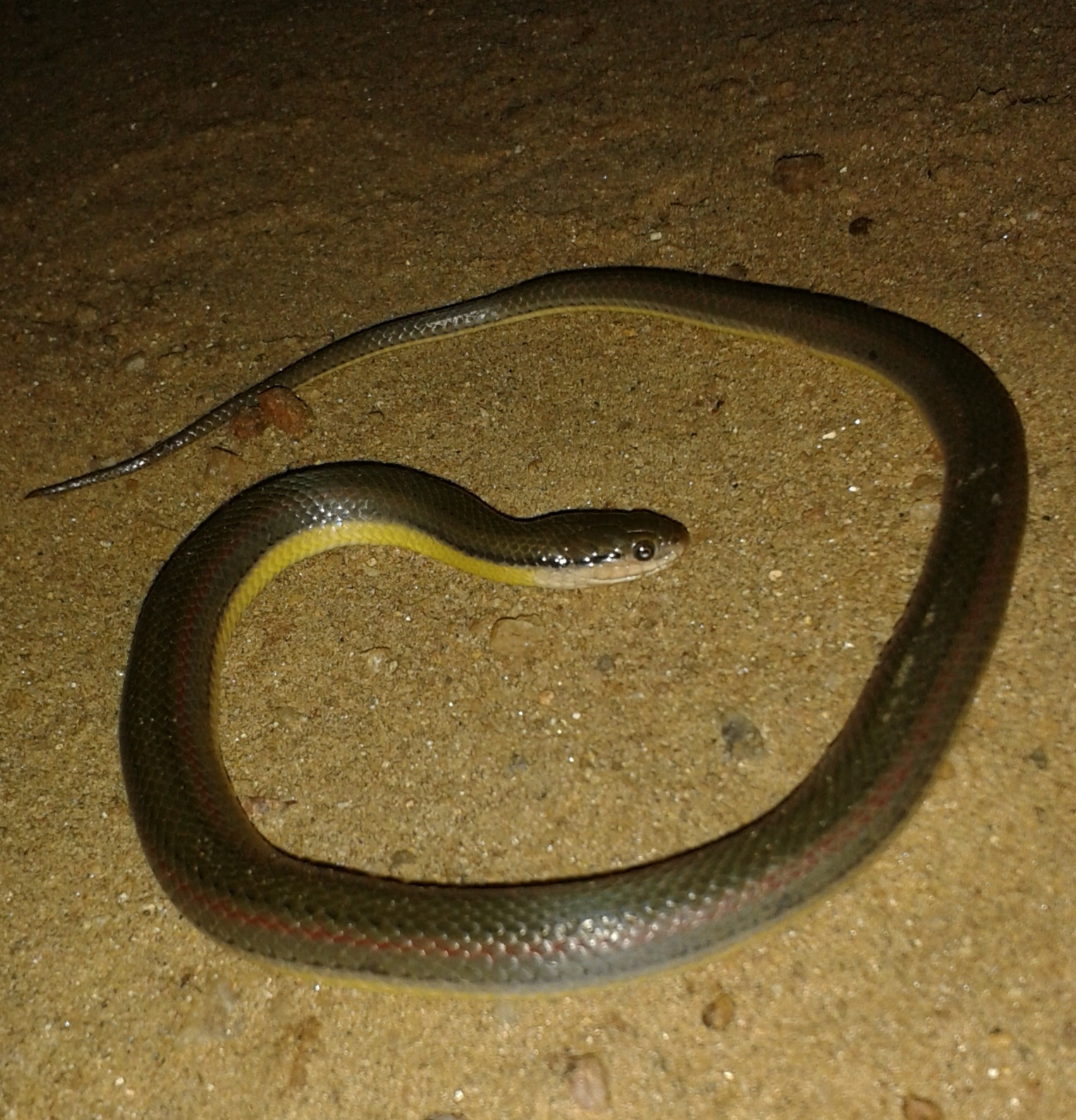

Conservation status
- Least Concern (IUCN 3.1)

Scientific classification
- Kingdom: Animalia
- Phylum: Chordata
- Class: Reptilia
- Order: Squamata
- Suborder: Serpentes
- Family: Colubridae
- Genus: Atretium; Cope, 1861
- Species: A. schistosum

Binomial name
- Atretium schistosum (Daudin, 1803)

= Atretium =

Species of snake

Atretium schistosum, also known commonly as the split keelback and the olive keelback wart snake, is a species of snake in the subfamily Natricinae of the family Colubridae. The species, which is the sole species in the genus Atretium, is native to South Asia. It is a common and harmless watersnake.

== Geographic range ==
A. schistosum is found in Sri Lanka, India, Bangladesh and Nepal. In India it occurs in peninsular India south of latitude 15 degrees north and along the east coast to Uttarakhand. It is reported to be very common around Bangalore, North Arcot district (Tamil Nadu) and Kakinada area in Andhra Pradesh. Occurs up to 1000 m (3280 ft) above sea level. Absent from most of North India.

== Description ==
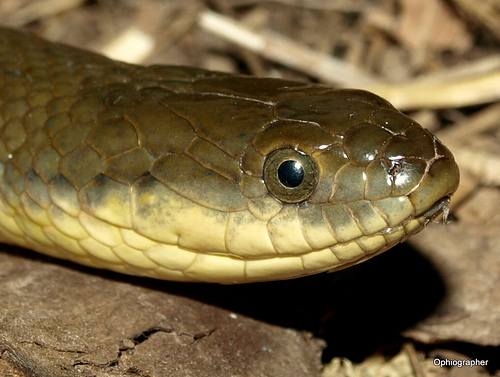
head details

A. schistosum is a small, robust snake with thin head, short snout and slit nostrils placed rather high. The snake is olive-green and yellow to orange below. It is sometimes tinged with pink or purplish on the flanks. The length of the tail is one third to one-fourth of the total length.

The dorsal scales are rough because they are keeled. Specimens from South India have a distinct reddish line along the 5th and 6th or the 4th and 5th up to the vent. This line is brighter in the males. The females are between 70 and 75 cm long, and the males between 50 and 60 cm. The longest measured snake is 87 cm long.

=== Identifying characteristics ===
A. schistosum is distinguished by a number of scale characteristics:

1. Single internasal.
2. Nineteen rows of costals.
3. 8 or 9 supralabials (upper lip shields).

It can easily be confused with olive forest snake (Rhabdops olivaceus).

== Habits ==
A. schistosum lives in water or among the surrounding vegetation. A diurnal snake, it is seen at night also. The snake rarely bites when handled. It is known to aestivate in the summer.

The olive keelback feeds mainly on frogs, tadpoles, fish and crabs which it catches with a side-stroke motion that is characteristic of watersnakes. The snake swims past the prey and suddenly snaps its head to the side. The olive keelback is also known to eat mosquito larvae. Sometimes, referred to as a water-cobra, the olive keelback is nevertheless tolerated by people.

== Reproduction ==
A. schistosum is oviparous (egg laying). It breeds in the monsoon. The eggs, which are white, soft and 30–35 mm (1.2–1.4 in) in length, are laid in clutches of 10 to 32 in the months January to April. The newly hatched snakes measure 16.6–17.5 cm (6.5–6.9 in) in length.

== Local names ==
- Malayalam - Pacha neerkoli
- Tamil - Koraipaambu or Pachai thanneer paambu
- Kannada – Barmmya
- Telugu – Nalla wahlagillee
- Sinhala – Diya warnaya
- Bangla – Mete shap.
