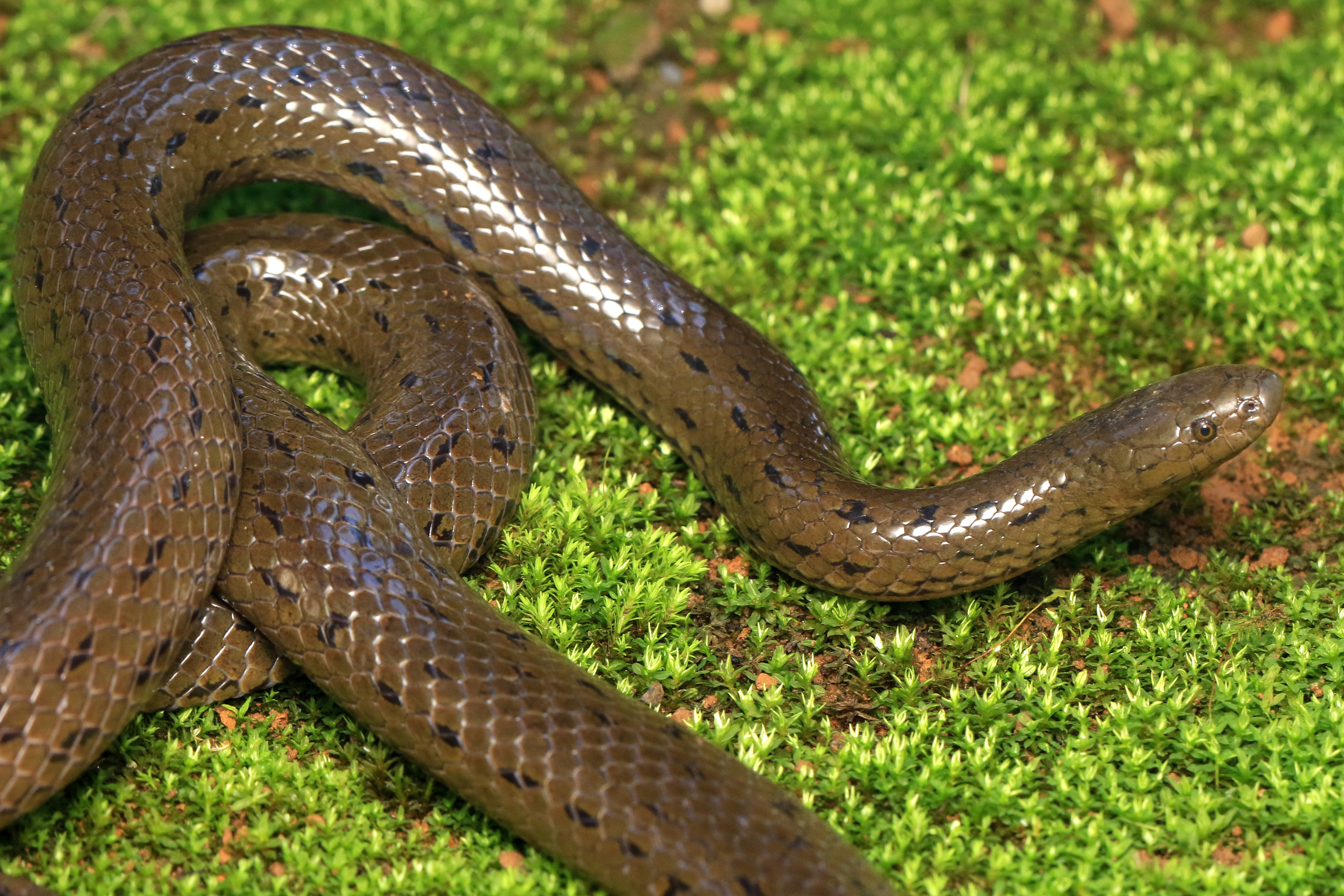
- R. olivaceus

Scientific classification
- Kingdom: Animalia
- Phylum: Chordata
- Class: Reptilia
- Order: Squamata
- Suborder: Serpentes
- Family: Colubridae
- Subfamily: Natricinae
- Genus: Rhabdops; Boulenger, 1893

Species
- Two species; see text.

= Rhabdops =

Genus of snakes

Rhabdops is a genus of snakes in the subfamily Natricinae of the family Colubridae. The genus is endemic to the Western Ghats of India.

== Species ==
The genus Rhabdops contains two recognized valid species:

- Rhabdops aquaticus Giri, Deepak, Captain & Gower, 2017 – aquatic rhabdops, water rhabdops
- Rhabdops olivaceus (Beddome, 1863) – olive forest snake, olive trapezoid snake

The species R. bicolor was removed from Rhabdops in 2019, and placed in the newly erected genus Smithophis.

Nota bene: A binomial authority in parentheses indicates that the species was originally described in a genus other than Rhabdops.
