= Kelyophis =

Kelyophis Temporal range: Late Cretaceous, 70–66 Ma

Scientific classification
- Domain: Eukaryota
- Kingdom: Animalia
- Phylum: Chordata
- Class: Reptilia
- Order: Squamata
- Suborder: Serpentes
- Infraorder: Alethinophidia
- Family: †Nigerophiidae
- Genus: †Kelyophis; Laduke et al., 2010

Species
- K. hechti Laduke et al., 2010 (type)

Extinct genus of snakes

Kelyophis (/keɪliːˈoʊfɪs/; meaning 'small serpent' from the Malagasy word kely (meaning "small") and the Greek word ὄφις (ophis, meaning "serpent")) is an extinct genus of nigerophiid snake which existed in Madagascar during the Late Cretaceous. The type species is Kelyophis hechti. Trunk vertebrae have been found from the Maastrichtian-age Maevarano Formation in the Mahajanga Basin. Kelyophis is similar to other nigerophiids in its small size (less than 1 m (3.3 ft)), long centra with posterior surfaces that deflect slightly downward, tubercular-shaped neural spines that are directed toward the back of the neural arches, and several other features of the vertebrae.

While most nigerophiids were aquatic, Kelyophis was not as specialized for aquatic life. It has shorter vertebrae and synapophyses that are less ventrally shifted than aquatic nigerophiids. During the Late Cretaceous, the Maevarano Formation was part of a semiarid and highly seasonal environment that may have been unsuitable for an aquatic lifestyle.
