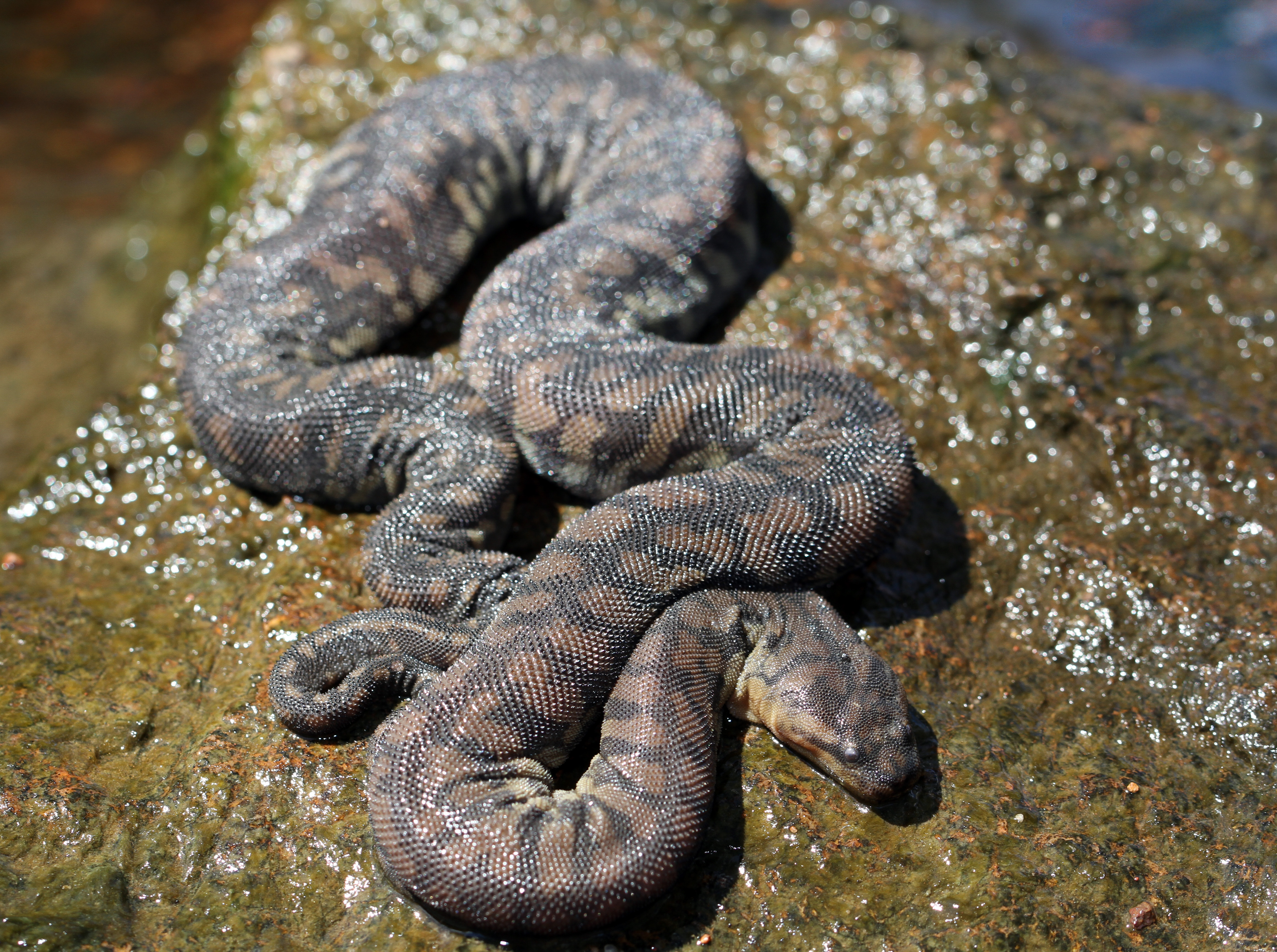
- Arafura File Snake (Acrochordus arafurae)
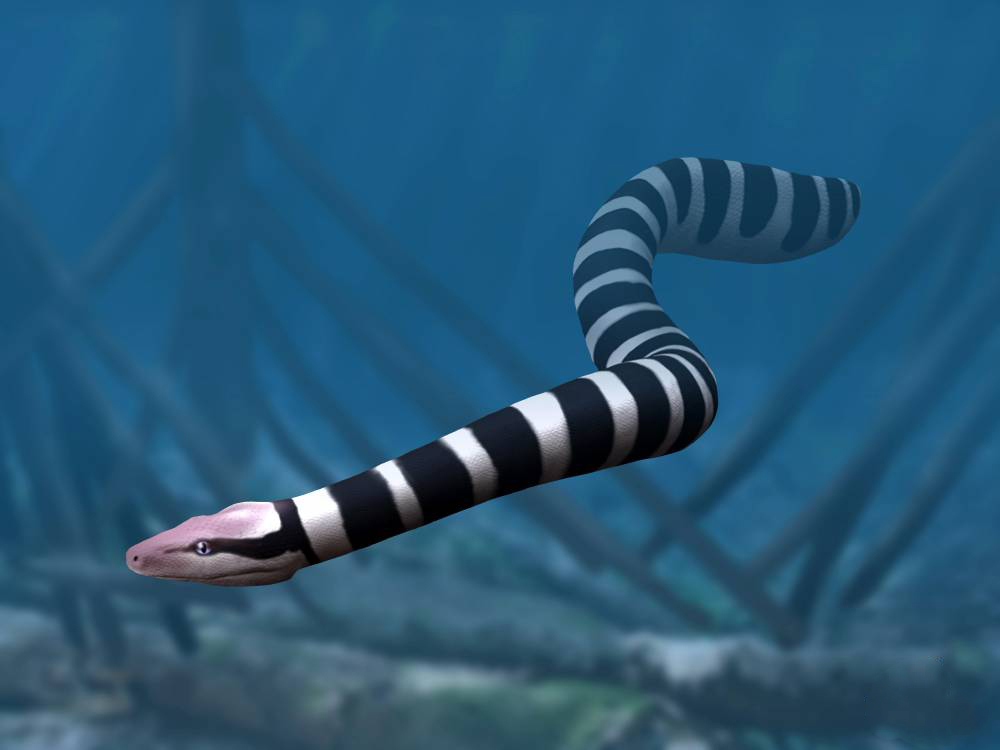
- Life restoration of Palaeophis maghrebianus

Scientific classification
- Kingdom: Animalia
- Phylum: Chordata
- Class: Reptilia
- Order: Squamata
- Suborder: Serpentes
- Clade: Caenophidia
- Superfamily: Acrochordoidea; McDowell, 1979

Families
- Acrochordidae; †Palaeophiidae; †Nigerophiidae

= Acrochordoidea =

Acrochordoidea Temporal range: 99.7–0 Ma Late Cretaceous - Present

Superfamily of reptiles

Acrochordoidea is a superfamily of snakes that contains only one extant family, the file snakes (Acrochordidae), as well as two extinct families, Nigerophiidae and Palaeophiidae. Members of this superfamily are largely aquatic in nature, with some species found in marine habitats, much as with the only distantly related sea snakes. Members of Palaeophiidae and Nigerophiidae could grow incredibly large and some species, such as members of the genus Palaeophis, were among the largest snakes to ever exist.
