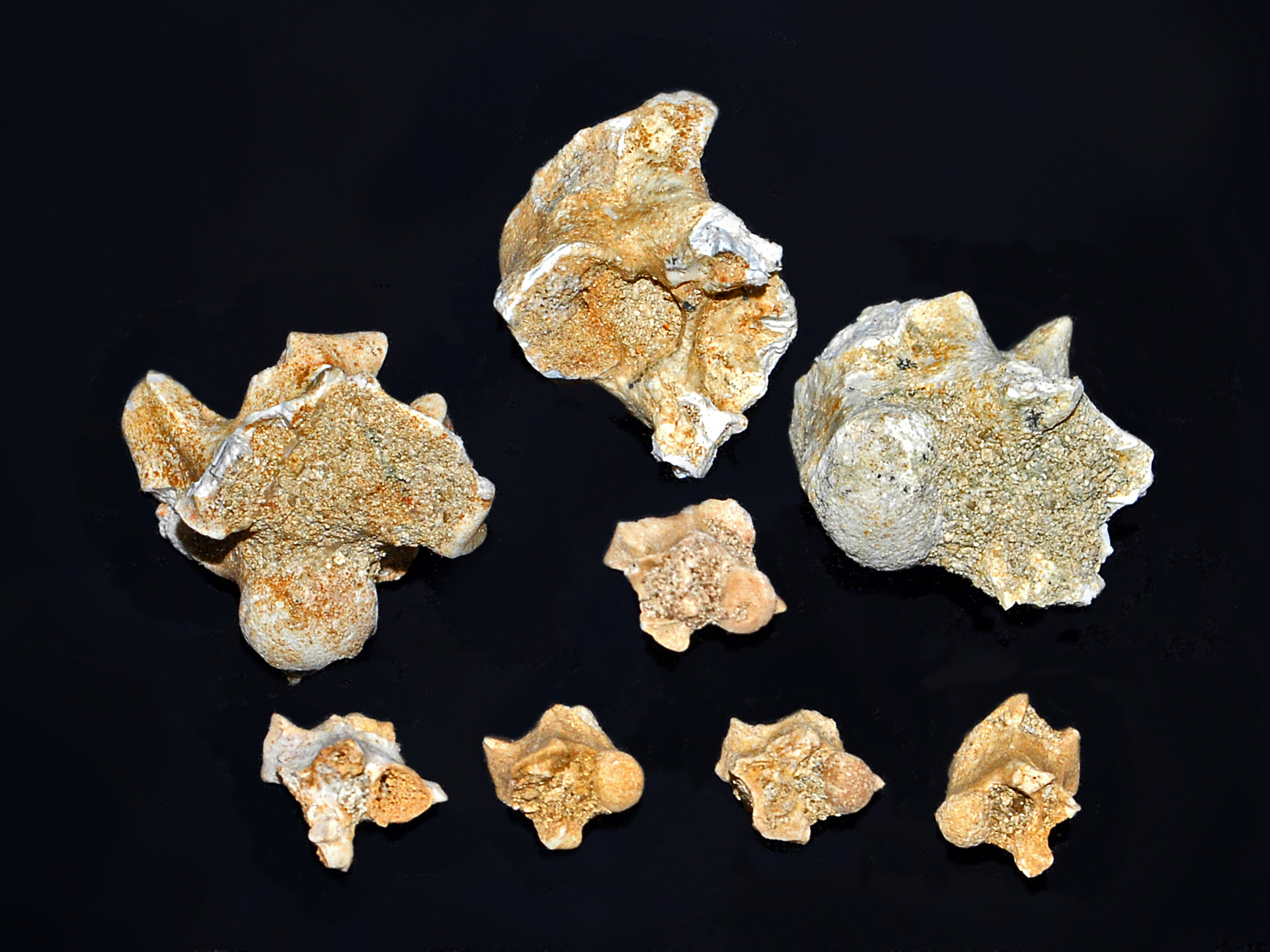
- Fossil vertebrae of Palaeophis maghrebianus from Khouribga (Morocco)

Scientific classification
- Kingdom: Animalia
- Phylum: Chordata
- Class: Reptilia
- Order: Squamata
- Suborder: Serpentes
- Family: †Palaeophiidae
- Subfamily: †Palaeophiinae
- Genus: †Palaeophis; Owen, 1841

Type species
- †Palaeophis toliapicus Owen, 1841

Species
- Species: †Palaeophis africanus Andrews 1924; †Palaeophis casei Holman 1982; †Palaeophis colossaeus Rage 1983; †Palaeophis ferganicus Averianov 1997; †Palaeophis grandis Marsh 1869; †Palaeophis littoralis Cope 1847; †Palaeophis maghrebianus Arambourg 1952; †Palaeophis nessovi Averianov 1997; †Palaeophis oweni Zigno 1881; †Palaeophis tamdy Averianov 1997; †Palaeophis toliapicus Owen 1841(type); †Palaeophis typhaeus Owen 1850; †Palaeophis vastaniensis Bajpai & Head 2008; †Palaeophis virginianus Lynn 1934; †Palaeophis zhylan Averianov 1997

Synonyms
- Dinophis (Marsh, 1869); Titanophis (Marsh, 1878); Vialovophis (Averianov, 1997)

= Palaeophis =

Palaeophis Temporal range: Ypresian - Priabonian, 56.0–33.9 Ma Possible Cenomanian - Maastrichtian record

Extinct genus of snakes

Palaeophis ('ancient snake') is an extinct genus of marine snake that is the type genus of the extinct snake family Palaeophiidae.

Described species within this genus lived in the Eocene epoch, with some unnamed or questionable records from Cenomanian and Maastrichtian. Fossils of species within this genus have been found in England, France, Denmark, Morocco, and Mali. Remains have also been found in North America, including Maryland and Virginia (from the early Eocene Nanjemoy Formation), Georgia, and Mississippi. Remains attributed to Paleophis have also been reported from Asia, including Kyrgyzstan, Tajikistan, Uzbekistan, Kazakhstan (including Vialovophis), and India.

== Description ==
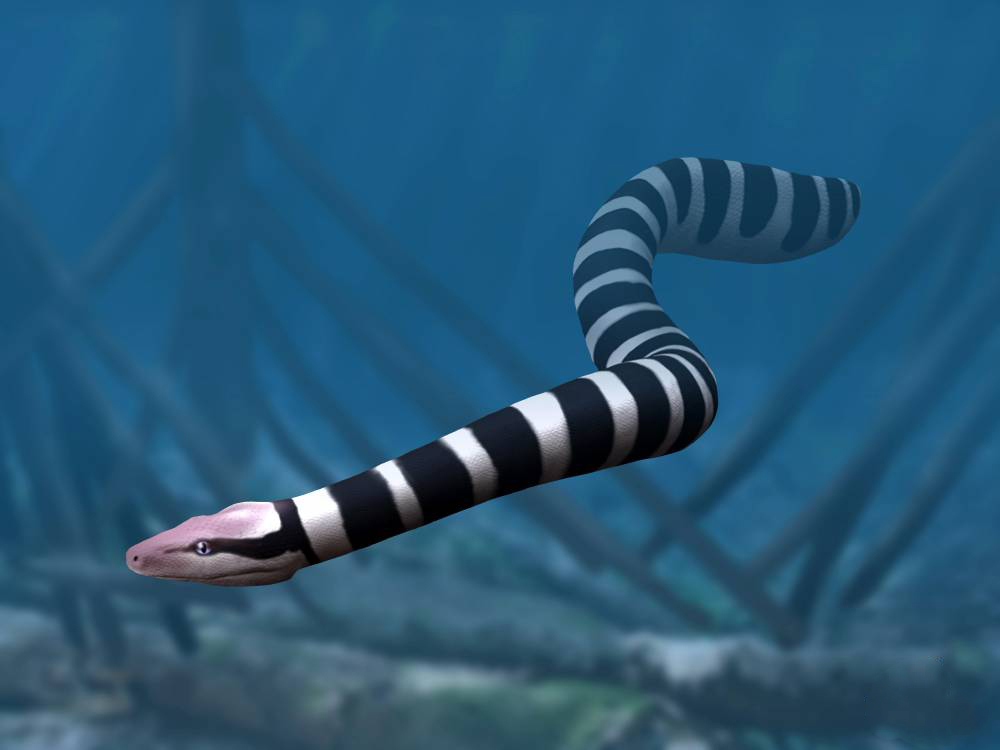
Restoration of Palaeophis maghrebianus

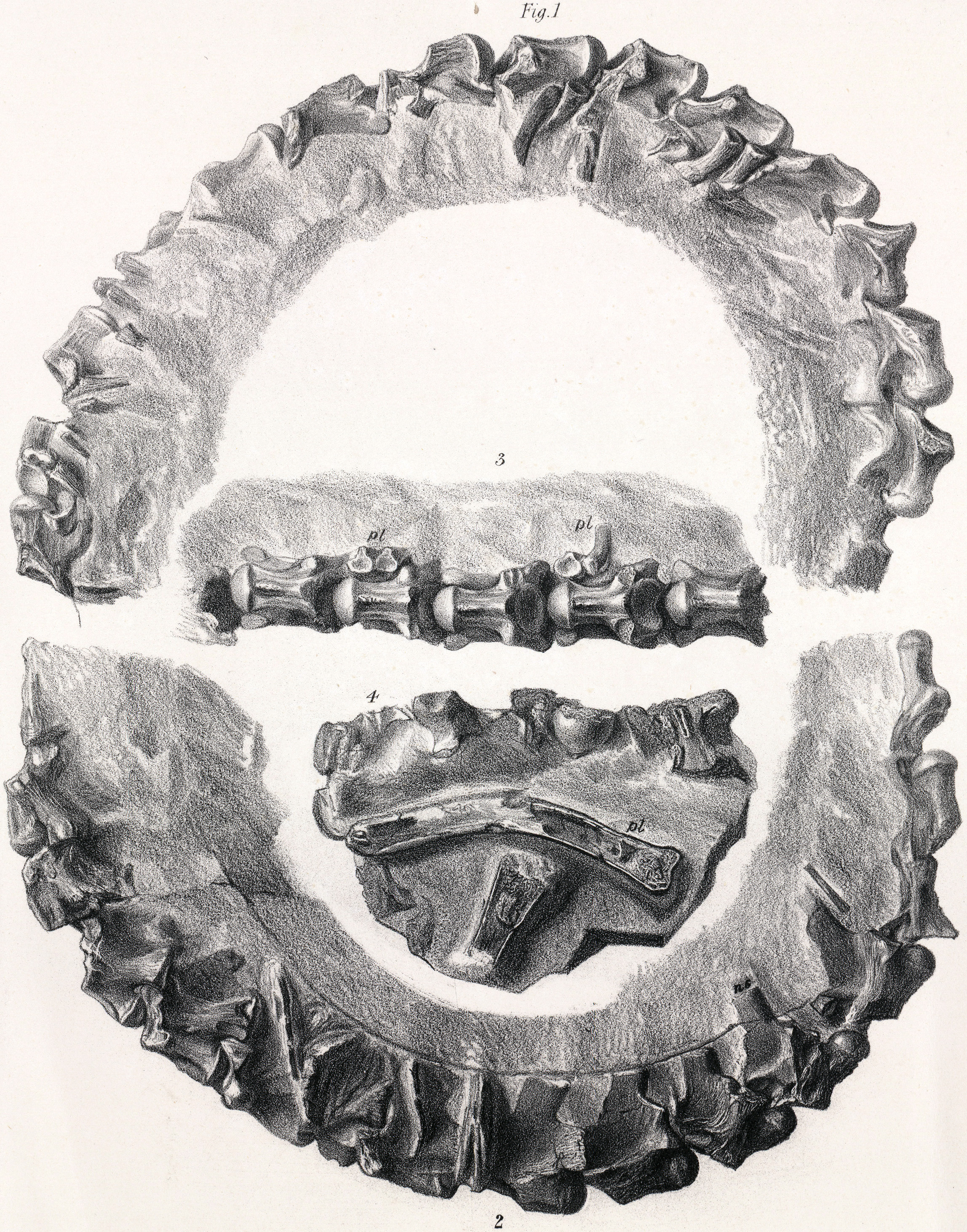
Illustration of articulated vertebrae of P. toliapicus from Sheppy and Bracklesham, England, UK

These species varied broadly in size; Palaeophis casei is the smallest at 1.3 metres of length, while the largest species, Palaeophis colossaeus, is estimated to have been 8.1–12.3 m (27–40 ft) long based on isolated vertebrae, making it one of the largest known snakes. However, most species of the genus were not as big. There are many species of Palaeophis but they can be separated into two assemblages of species or grades. In which the primitive grade include species whose vertebrae are weakly laterally compressed and have less developed and low process of vertebrae. Subsequently the advanced grade are characterized by vertebrae presenting a strong lateral compression which translate to being much better adapted to aquatic life.

== Biology ==
Species of Palaeophis were specialised aquatic animals, as their fossils occur primarily in marine strata, though at least some estuarine remains have also been found. Different species are thought to have occupied different ecological niches. It is difficult to determine whether palaeophiids were macrophagous, that is, had the ability to consume prey of larger diameter than themselves. To settle this question, cranial material is necessary. The closet putative relatives of Palaeophis with skulls, A. proavus and ”Archaeophis” turkmenicus, provide contradictory evidence as to the kinetic capabilities of the skull. Archaeophis proavus was hypothesized to have had a kinetic skull similar to that of many living snakes, whereas ”A.” turkmenicus is reported to have less mobile cranial joints. If the skull of Palaeophis colossaeus was closer to that of A. proavus, the upper limit for the size of consumable food would have been quite large. Contemporaneous species that could have been part of the diet of Palaeophis colossaeus in Mali include sharks, lungfish, pycnodontids and other large fishes, dyrosaurid crocodyliformes, and turtles. It is also not certain whether palaeophiids were constrictors. If palaeophiids were macrophagous, it is likely they would have killed large prey before attempting to consume them to prevent serious damage to their heads in the process.

Studies on Palaeophis vertebrae show a high degree of vascularisation, suggesting that it had a considerably faster metabolism and growth rate than modern snakes. This may suggest that palaeophiids, like other marine reptiles such as mosasaurs, might have developed towards endothermy.
