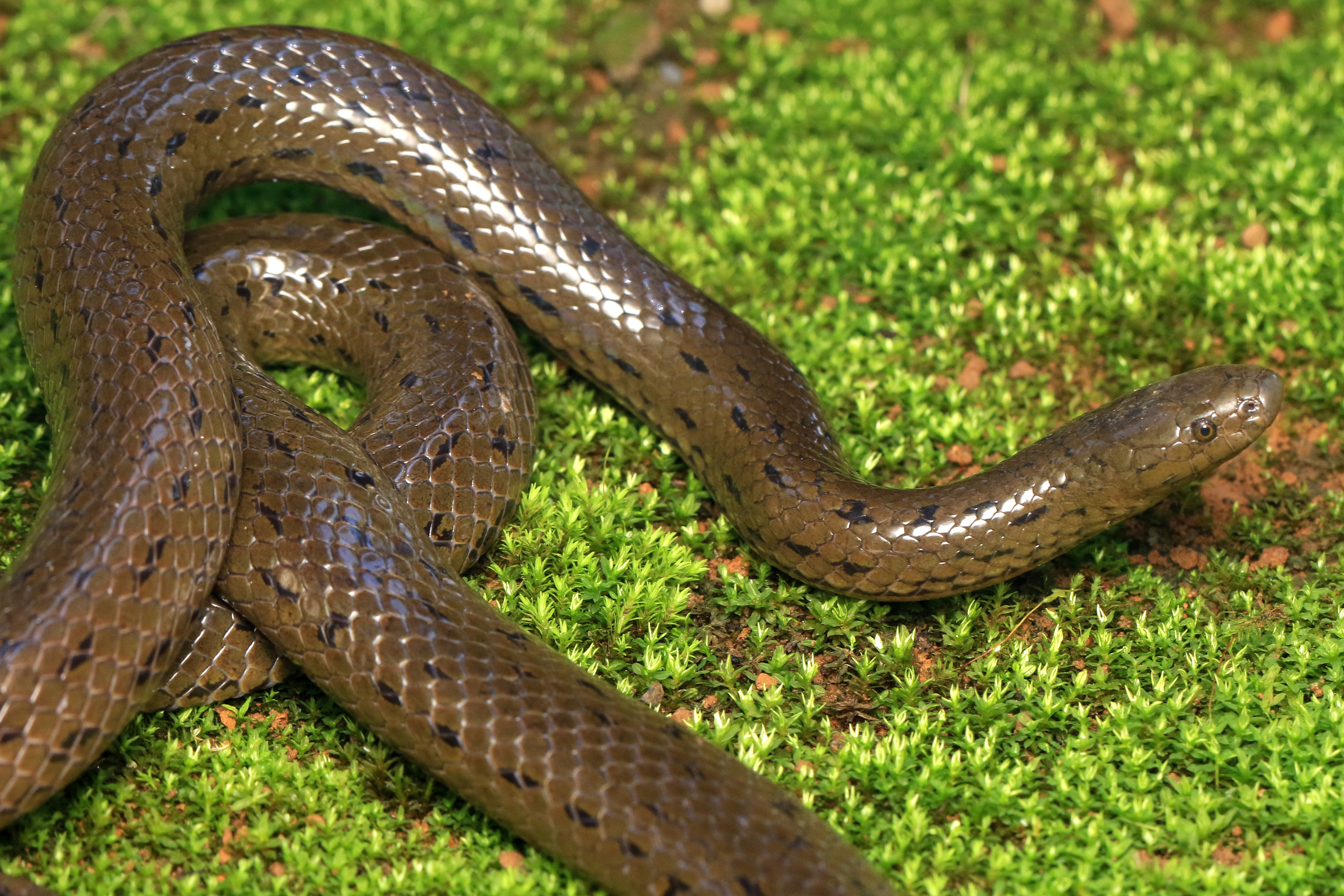

Conservation status
- Near Threatened (IUCN 3.1)

Scientific classification
- Kingdom: Animalia
- Phylum: Chordata
- Class: Reptilia
- Order: Squamata
- Suborder: Serpentes
- Family: Colubridae
- Genus: Rhabdops
- Species: R. olivaceus

Binomial name
- Rhabdops olivaceus (Beddome, 1863)

Synonyms
- Ablabes olivaceus Beddome, 1863; Pseudocyclophis olivaceus (Beddome, 1863)

= Rhabdops olivaceus =

Species of snake

Rhabdops olivaceus, the olive trapezoid snake or olive forest snake, is a snake endemic to the Western Ghats of India. Following the description of populations in Goa, northernmost Karnataka, and southern Maharashtra as a new species, Rhabdops aquaticus, the known range of Rhabdops olivaceus is from Parambikulam Tiger Reserve in Kerala north to Kottigehara in Karnataka, and possibly slightly further.

This species is found in damp steamsides within rainforests and is distributed from Palghat in Kerala to the Malanad area of Karnataka. It is a docile, placid snake and is said to be semiaquatic, feeding on small, soft-bodied animals. In habits, it is more frequently seen during the rains, both day or night.
