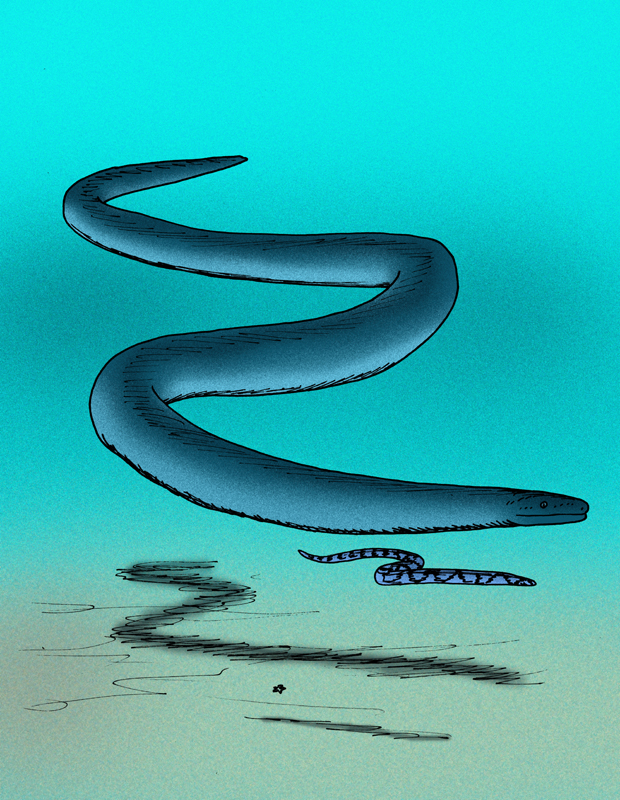
- Illustration of Amananula sanogoi (above) and Nigerophis sp. (below)

Scientific classification
- Kingdom: Animalia
- Phylum: Chordata
- Class: Reptilia
- Order: Squamata
- Suborder: Serpentes
- Family: †Nigerophiidae
- Genus: †Amananulam; McCartney et al., 2018
- Species: †A. sanogoi

Binomial name
- †Amananulam sanogoi McCartney et al., 2018

= Amananulam =

Amananulam Temporal range: Paleocene

Extinct genus of snakes

Amananulam is an extinct genus of nigerophiid snake that lived during the Palaeogene period. It is monotypic, containing the single species Amananulam sanogoi.

== Distribution ==
Amananulam sanogoi fossils are known from Mali, much of which was at the time submerged as part of the shallow Trans-Saharan Seaway.
