= Smithophis linearis =

Scientific classification
- Kingdom: Animalia
- Phylum: Chordata
- Class: Reptilia
- Order: Squamata
- Suborder: Serpentes
- Family: Colubridae
- Genus: Smithophis
- Species: S. linearis

Binomial name
- Smithophis linearis Vogel, Chen, Deepak, Gower, Shi, Ding, & Hou, 2020

Species of snake

The Jingpo mountain stream snake or lined smithophis (Smithophis linearis) is a species of snake found in China.
