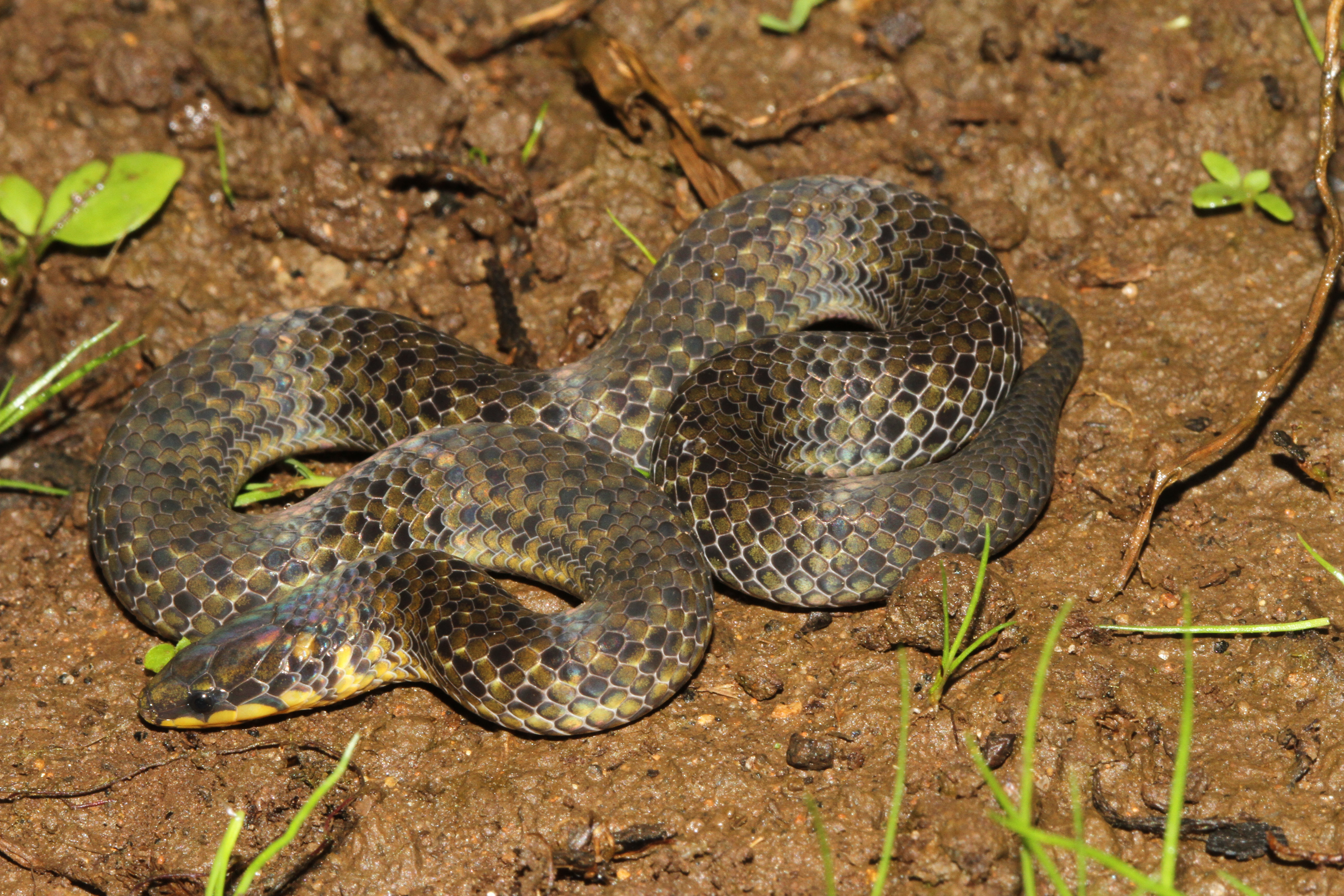
- Xylophis mosaicus from Munnar

Scientific classification
- Kingdom: Animalia
- Phylum: Chordata
- Class: Reptilia
- Order: Squamata
- Suborder: Serpentes
- Family: Pareidae
- Subfamily: Xylophiinae; Deepak, Ruane & Gower, 2019
- Genus: Xylophis; Beddome, 1878

Type species
- Geophis stenorhynchus Günther, 1875

= Xylophis =

Genus of snakes

Xylophis is a small genus of snakes in the family Pareidae. The genus contains six species, all of which are endemic to the Western Ghats in southern India. All six species are non-venomous. They constitute the monotypic subfamily Xylophiinae. They are the only pareid snakes found in India and the only snakes in the family found outside Southeast Asia.

== Species ==
The following six species are recognized as being valid:

- Xylophis captaini Gower & Winkler, 2007 — Captain's wood snake, Captain's xylophis
- Xylophis chenkaruppan Narayanan, S. Das, Ghosh, Palot, Umesh, Gower & Deepak, 2025 — red and black wood snake
- Xylophis deepaki Narayanan, Mohapatra, Balan, S. Das & Gower, 2021 — Deepak's wood snake
- Xylophis mosaicus Deepak, Narayanan, S. Das, Rajkumar, Easa, Sreejith & Gower, 2020 — Anamalai wood snake
- Xylophis perroteti (A.M.C. Duméril, Bibron & A.H.A. Duméril, 1854) — Perrotet's mountain snake, striped narrow-headed snake
- Xylophis stenorhynchus (Günther, 1875) — Günther's mountain snake
