= Smithophis arunachalensis =

Scientific classification
- Kingdom: Animalia
- Phylum: Chordata
- Order: Squamata
- Suborder: Serpentes
- Family: Colubridae
- Genus: Smithophis
- Species: S. arunachalensis

Binomial name
- Smithophis arunachalensis Das, Deepak, Captain, Wade, & Gower, 2020

Species of snake

The Arunachal rain snake or black and yellow smithophis (Smithophis arunachalensis) is a species of snake found in India.
