= Smithophis bicolor =

Brown trapezoid snake

Conservation status
- Least Concern (IUCN 3.1)

Scientific classification
- Kingdom: Animalia
- Phylum: Chordata
- Class: Reptilia
- Order: Squamata
- Suborder: Serpentes
- Family: Colubridae
- Genus: Smithophis
- Species: S. bicolor

Binomial name
- Smithophis bicolor (Blyth, 1854)

Synonyms
- Calamaria bicolor, Blyth, 1854; Rhabdops bicolor, Boulenger, 1893

Species of snake

The brown trapezoid snake (Smithophis bicolor) is a species of snake found in India (Assam, Meghalaya; Arunachal Pradesh (Deban, Namdapha - Changlang district)), North Myanmar (Burma), and China (West Yunnan). While formerly classified under the genus Rhabdops, a study published in 2019 found it to belong to the new genus Smithophis.
