= Smithophis atemporalis =

Conservation status
- Data Deficient (IUCN 3.1)

Scientific classification
- Kingdom: Animalia
- Phylum: Chordata
- Class: Reptilia
- Order: Squamata
- Suborder: Serpentes
- Family: Colubridae
- Genus: Smithophis
- Species: S. atemporalis

Binomial name
- Smithophis atemporalis Giri, Gower, Das, Lalremsanga, Lalronunga, Captain, & Deepak, 2019

Species of snake

The Mizo rain snake or narrow-headed smithophis (Smithophis atemporalis) is a species of snake found in India.

The Mizo Rain Snake, a recently discovered non-venomous serpent, adds a splash of color to Bangladesh's diverse ecosystems.
