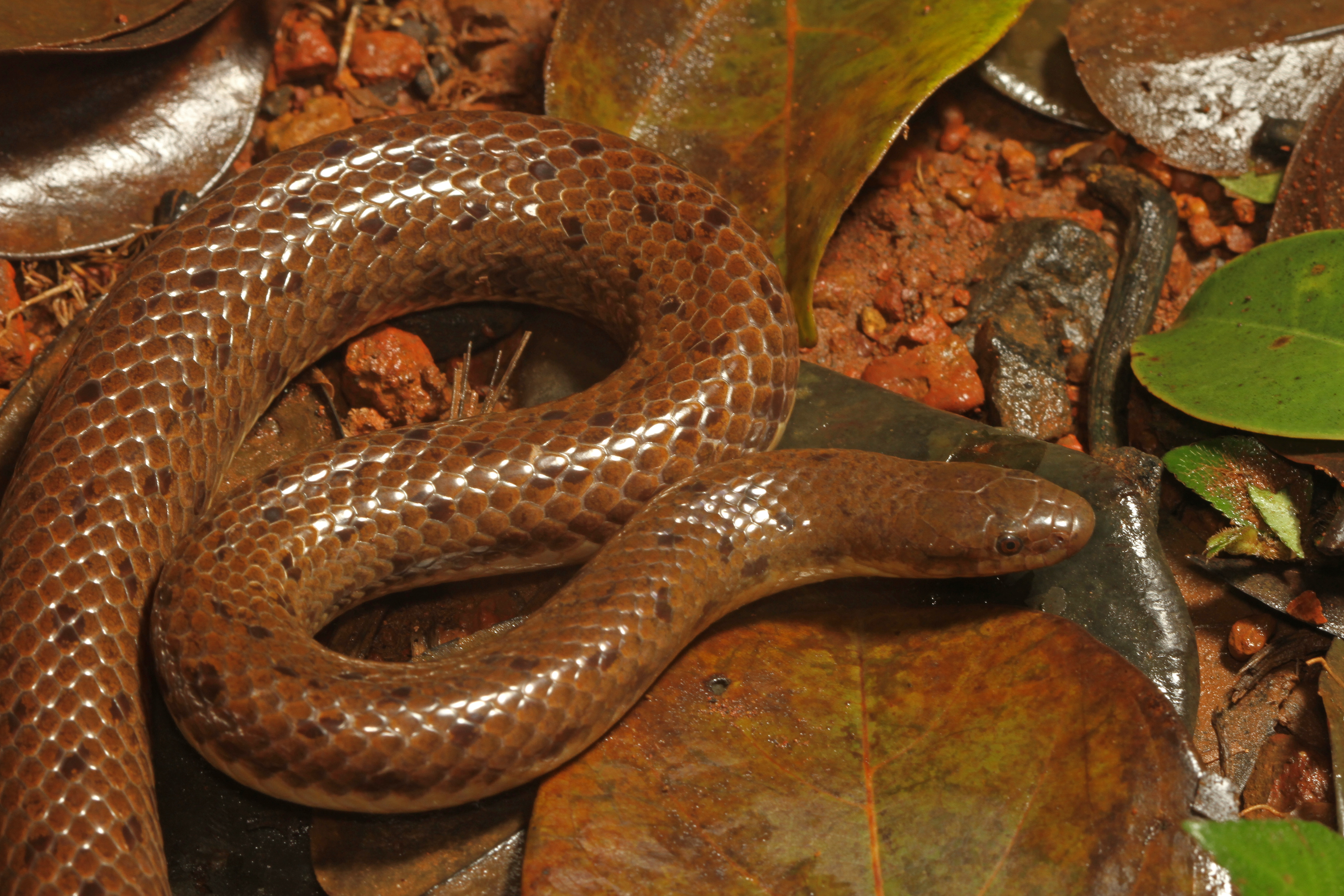

Conservation status
- Least Concern (IUCN 3.1)

Scientific classification
- Kingdom: Animalia
- Phylum: Chordata
- Class: Reptilia
- Order: Squamata
- Suborder: Serpentes
- Family: Colubridae
- Genus: Rhabdops
- Species: R. aquaticus

Binomial name
- Rhabdops aquaticus Giri, Deepak, Captain, and Gower, 2017

= Rhabdops aquaticus =

Species of snake

Rhabdops aquaticus, also known as the water rhabdops and aquatic rhabdops, is a nonvenomous aquatic species of snake. It is endemic to the Western Ghats in southern Maharashtra, northern Karnataka, and Goa states, India. It has an off-white belly and black spots on its olive brown skin; juveniles are olive green, with yellow undersides.
