= Smithophis =

Scientific classification
- Kingdom: Animalia
- Phylum: Chordata
- Class: Reptilia
- Order: Squamata
- Suborder: Serpentes
- Family: Colubridae
- Subfamily: Natricinae
- Genus: Smithophis; Giri, Gower, Das, Lalremsanga, Lalronunga, Captain, & Deepak, 2019

Species
- 5, see text.

Genus of snakes

Smithophis is a genus of snakes in the subfamily Natricinae of the family Colubridae; the one species that was known prior to 2019 had been classified under the genus Rhabdops, but was removed in the process of erecting the new genus Smithophis. The genus is endemic to Asia. It is named for Malcolm Arthur Smith, a British herpetologist who was active in Indian herpetology.

== Species ==
The following species are recognized as being valid:

- Smithophis arunachalensis Das, Deepak, Captain, Wade & Gower, 2020 – Arunachal rain snake, black and yellow smithophis
- Smithophis atemporalis Giri, Gower, Das, Lalremsanga, Lalronunga, Captain, & Deepak, 2019 – Mizo rain snake, narrow-headed smithophis
- Smithophis bicolor (Blyth, 1854) – brown trapezoid snake, two-colored forest snake
- Smithophis linearis Vogel, Chen, Deepak, Gower, Shi, Ding, & Hou, 2020 – Jingpo mountain stream snake, lined smithophis
- Smithophis mizoramensis Mirza, Bhardwaj, Lalmuanawma, Choure, Lalremsanga, Vabeiryureilai, Captain, Zagade & Patel, 2024 – Mizoram rain snake
- Smithophis leptofasciatus Lal Muansanga, Purkayastha, Hruaia, Vabeiryureilai, Lal Biakzuala, Decemson, Lalremsanga, & Bohra, 2025 – Narrow-banded rain snake

Nota bene: A binomial authority in parentheses indicates that the species was originally described in a genus other than Smithophis.
