= Azemiopsin =

Azemiopsin, a toxin obtained from the Azemiops feae viper venom, is a polypeptide that consists of 21 amino acid residues. It does not contain cysteine residues or disulfide bridges. The polypeptide can block skeletal muscle contraction by blocking nicotinic acetylcholine receptors.

== Sources ==
The toxin is derived from the venomous glands of the Azemiops feae viper species. The Azemiops feae viper is the only species within the Azemiopinae subfamily, which, together with Crotalinae and Viperinae subfamilies, belongs to the Viperidae family.

== Chemistry ==
=== Structure ===
Azemiopsin is a polypeptide molecule consisting of 21 residues, which does not contain cysteine residues or disulfide bridges. Its amino acid sequence is DNWWPKPPHQGPRPPRPRPKP and its molecular weight 2540 Da. Azemiopsin predominantly contains beta-structures: 62% consists of beta-structure (beta sheet + beta-turn), 34% consists of unordered structure, and the remaining 4% consist of alpha helix. This suggests that the polypeptide may likely adopt a hairpin-like structure.

=== Homology ===
Azemiopsin is structurally similar to waglerins, which are peptides from the venom produced by Tropidolaemus wagleri. This resemblance is especially apparent in the C-terminal part, which includes alternating prolines and positively charged residues. However, the absence of disulfide bridges in azemiopsin makes this toxin less stable compared to other acetylcholine receptor-blocking peptides.

== Target ==
Azemiopsin is a high-affinity selective inhibitor of muscle-type nicotinic acetylcholine receptors and it can thus block synaptic transmission at the neuromuscular junction. The peptide can inhibit (IC_{50} ≈ 19 nM) the muscle nicotinic acetylcholine receptor, assessed by measuring acetylcholine-evoked calcium responses in muscles. The peptide efficiently competes with bungarotoxin for binding to the Torpedo nicotinic acetylcholine receptor (IC_{50} = 0.18 ± 0.03 μM). Additionally, it has shown an inhibitory effect on mouse muscle type α1β1εδ nicotinic acetylcholine receptor in nanomolar range (IC_{50} = 19 ± 8 nM). The peptide is less effective (IC_{50} ≈ 3 μM) at α7 nicotinic acetylcholine receptors. The peptide displayed low affinity to α4β2 and α3-containing muscle nicotinic acetylcholine receptor. The peptide showed no effect on the GABA receptor and the 5-HT receptor at concentrations up to respectively 100 μm and 10 μm. In conclusion, azemiopsin shows high selectivity in inhibiting certain nicotinic acetylcholine receptor subtypes.

== Mode of action ==
Azemiopsin is a blocker of the nicotinic acetylcholine receptor in muscle.

== Toxicity ==
Research has been done on the toxicity of azemiopsin for three different routes of administration in mice: intraperitoneal, intravenous and intramuscular. For intraperitoneal administration LD_{50} was 2.6 ± 0.3 mg/kg, for intravenous administration LD_{50} was 0.51 ± 0.06 mg/kg, and for intramuscular injection, it was 0.732 ± 0.13 mg/kg. intramuscular injection of Azemiopsin at a dosis between 0.3 mg/kg and 0.7 mg/kg results in various symptoms, including impaired coordination of movements, loss of muscle tone, decreased motor activity, impaired breathing, and decreased response to external stimuli. The symptoms appeared roughly 5 to 7 minutes after injection and were the most severe between 10 and 20 minutes. After a period of 60 minutes, most mice showed almost complete recovery but still had lowered motor activity and muscle tone

== Therapeutic Use ==
Azemiopsin has potential to be used therapeutically as a muscle relaxant because of its ability to selectively inhibit the nicotinic acetylcholine receptors. Moreover, the peptide is not inferior to the relaxants that are currently used but it is still in the preclinical study phase.
