= Xenophidion schaeferi =

Conservation status
- Data Deficient (IUCN 3.1)

Scientific classification
- Kingdom: Animalia
- Phylum: Chordata
- Class: Reptilia
- Order: Squamata
- Suborder: Serpentes
- Family: Xenophidiidae
- Genus: Xenophidion
- Species: X. schaeferi

Binomial name
- Xenophidion schaeferi R. Günther & Manthey, 1995

Species of snake

Xenophidion schaeferi, also known commonly as the Malayan spinejaw snake or Schäfer's spiny-jawed snake, is a species of snake in the monotypic family Xenophidiidae. The species is endemic to Malaysia.

== Etymology ==
The specific name, schaeferi is in honor of German herpetologist Christian Schäfer who collected the holotype.

== Geographic range ==
X. schaeferi is found in the Malaysian state of Selangor, in western Peninsular Malaysia.

== Habitat ==
The preferred natural habitat of X. schaeferi is forest.

== Reproduction ==
X. schaeferi is oviparous.

== DNA sequence divergence of sibling species ==
In the genus Xenophidion, there is one sister species, X. acanthognathus. Molecular analyses of a new specimen of X. acanthognathus reveal that it only differs from the holotype of X. schaeferi by a minimum sequence divergence of 0.27%.
