= Captain's wood snake =

Conservation status
- Least Concern (IUCN 3.1)

Scientific classification
- Kingdom: Animalia
- Phylum: Chordata
- Order: Squamata
- Suborder: Serpentes
- Family: Pareidae
- Subfamily: Xylophiinae
- Genus: Xylophis
- Species: X. captaini

Binomial name
- Xylophis captaini Gower & Winkler, 2007

Species of snake

Captain's wood snake (Xylophis captaini), also known commonly as Captain's xylophis, is a species of snake in the family Pareidae. The species is endemic to India.

== Geographic range ==
The holotype of X. captaini is from Kanam, Kottayam district, in the state of Kerala and was found in 2000. Captain's wood snake has been recorded at low altitudes on the western side of the southern part of the Western Ghats, south of the Palakkad Gap.

== Habitat ==
The preferred natural habitat of X. captaini is forest at altitudes from sea level to 300 m (980 ft), but it has also been found in disturbed areas such as plantations.

== Description ==
A small species of snake, X. captaini does not exceed 20 cm (7.9 in) in total length (including tail).

== Behavior ==
X. captaini is nocturnal, and burrows in leaf litter, humus, and soil to a depth of 10 cm (3.9 in). The species is non-venomous.

== Diet ==
X. captaini preys predominantly on earthworms.

== Reproduction ==
X. captaini is oviparous.

== Etymology ==
The specific name, captaini, and the common names, Captain's wood snake and Captain's xylophis, are in honor of Indian herpetologist Ashok Captain for his work on Indian snakes.
