= Azemiops =

- Azemiops feae in China

Conservation status
- Least Concern (IUCN 3.1)

Scientific classification
- Kingdom: Animalia
- Phylum: Chordata
- Class: Reptilia
- Order: Squamata
- Suborder: Serpentes
- Family: Viperidae
- Subfamily: Azemiopinae; Liem, Marx & Rabb, 1971
- Genus: Azemiops; Boulenger, 1888

Species
- A. feae Boulenger, 1888; A. kharini Orlov, Ryabov & Nguyen, 2013

Genus of snakes

Azemiopinae is a monogeneric subfamily created for the genus Azemiops that contains the viper species A. feae and A. kharini. They are commonly known as Fea's vipers. No subspecies are recognized. The first specimen was collected by Italian explorer Leonardo Fea, and was described as a new genus and new species by Boulenger in 1888. Formerly considered to be one of the most primitive vipers, molecular studies have shown that it is the sister taxon to the pit vipers, Crotalinae. It is found in the mountains of Southeast Asia, in China, southeastern Tibet, and Vietnam. Like all other vipers, they are venomous.

== Description ==
Neither species grows to 1 m in length. According to Liem et al. (1971), the maximum length is 77 cm, while Orlov (1997) described a male and a female measuring 72 cm and 78 cm, respectively.

It is considered to be the most primitive of all viperids for several reasons. It has a reasonably sturdy body and a short tail, but the dorsal scales are smooth rather than keeled like those of most vipers. The head, which is slightly flattened and more elliptical in shape than triangular, is not covered with numerous small scales like most other vipers, but with large shields like the colubrids and the elapids. Also, the skull is built differently. It does, however, have a pair of hollow, rotating fangs, although these are short. The fangs have a ridge at the tip lateral to the discharge orifice, as well as a blade-like structure on the ventral surface otherwise seen only in some opistoglyphous and atractaspid snakes. The venom glands are relatively small. Unlike most vipers, Fea's viper is oviparous and hibernates during the winter.

The color pattern of Fea's viper is striking; dorsally, its basic body color is a shiny, deep blue-gray to black, marked by several widely spaced, thin (one or two scales), white-orange crossbands. The head is orange to slightly yellow with a distinct cross-pattern outlined in gray. The eyes are yellowish with vertical pupils. Ventrally, it is olive-gray, with some small, lighter spots. The chin and throat are variegated with yellow.

The smooth dorsal scales are arranged in 17 rows at midbody. The anal plate is entire (undivided), but the subcaudals are in two rows (divided). The ventral count is around 180, and subcaudals around 40.

Internasals and prefrontals are subequal in length, which is between 0.7 and 1.0 mm. The frontal is slightly broader than long, nearly three times as broad as the supraocular. Parietals are as long as their distance from the end of the snout. The loreal scale is small, pentagonal, and as tall as long. Two (or three) preoculars and two postoculars are present, and two large superposed anterior temporals occur, but only the upper in contact with the postoculars. It has six upper labials. The first and second are smallest, the third enters the eye, and the fourth and fifth are largest. It has seven lower labials, the first is large and forms a suture with its fellow, and the second is small. It has one pair of short chin shields.

== Geographic range ==
These snakes range from northern Vietnam through southern China (Fujian, Guangxi, Jiangxi, Guizhou, Sichuan, Yunnan, Zhejiang), southeast Myanmar and southeast Tibet. The type locality is listed as "Kakhien Hills" (Kachin Hills), Myanmar. The two species are separated by the Red River, with A. kharini to the east and A. feae to the west.

== Habitat ==
Found in mountainous regions at altitudes up to 1000 m, they prefer cooler climates, with a typical temperature of 20-25 °C. Sometimes, they are found on roadsides, in straw and grass, in rice fields, and even in and around homes. In Vietnam, their preferred habitat is described as forests of bamboo and tree ferns, with clearings, where the forest floor is covered with rotting vegetation, with numerous rock outcroppings and many open and subterranean streams. The species is crepuscular, and prefers very moist environments for shelter.

== Behavior ==
This snake has a characteristic threat display. When disturbed, it flattens its body to make itself look wider, and its jaws flare outwards posteriorly, giving the normally ovoid head a triangular shape. Sometimes, it vibrates its tail. Ultimately, it will strike, during which it may or may not use its fangs. As opposed to Orlov (1997), who stated this species is nocturnal, Zhao et al. (1981) reported it to be crepuscular, active from early March into late November.

== Feeding ==
They apparently feed on small mammals. A captured, immature specimen was found to have eaten a common gray shrew (Crocidura attenuata). In captivity, these snakes are reported to be reluctant feeders, but when they did feed, they took newborn mice, and then only at night. On several occasions when feeding was observed, the prey was not released after being struck.

== Venom ==
The venom profile of Fea's viper is remarkably similar to that of Wagler's viper (Tropidolaemus wagleri). Another study found the enzyme activities in A. feae venom-gland extract are similar to those of viperine venoms, but its venom does not cause blood clotting, haemorrhagic, or myolytic activities. One toxin found in their venom, azemiopsin, is known to block nicotinic acetylcholine receptors in muscles.
