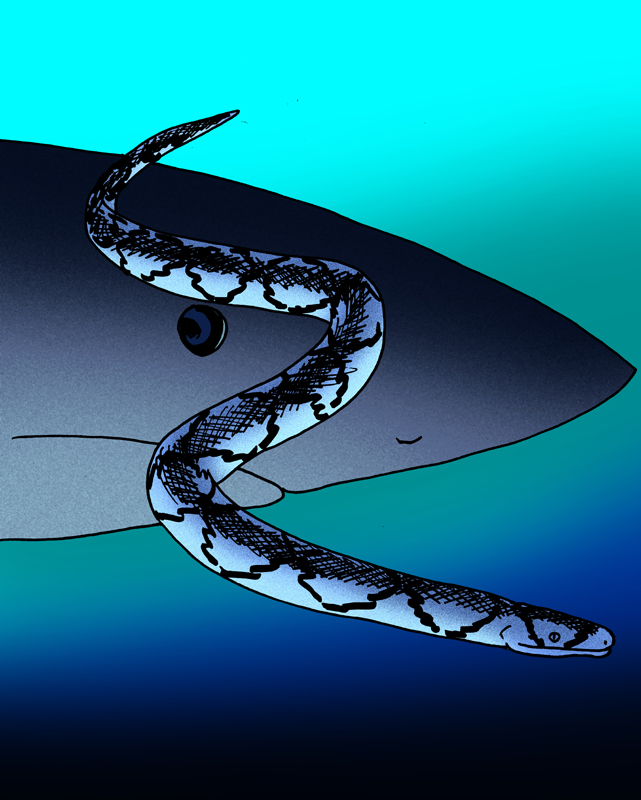
- Life restoration of Nigerophis

Scientific classification
- Kingdom: Animalia
- Phylum: Chordata
- Class: Reptilia
- Order: Squamata
- Suborder: Serpentes
- Infraorder: Alethinophidia
- Family: †Nigerophiidae; Rage, 1975

Genera
- See text

Synonyms
- Nigeropheidae

= Nigerophiidae =

Nigerophiidae Temporal range: Campanian–Late Eocene

Extinct family of reptiles

Nigerophiidae is an extinct family of marine snakes known from the Late Cretaceous to the Paleogene. Species of this family were found throughout much of the former Tethys Ocean (mainland Africa, Madagascar, Europe, Central Asia and India). Their taxonomic identity is uncertain due to their fragmentary remains. The earliest nigerophiid is Nubianophis from the Campanian of Sudan.

== Taxonomy ==
They are thought to be related to the Palaeophiidae due to their similar appearance, distribution, and temporal range, although this is questioned. Some analyses place both families in the superfamily Acrochordoidea along with the extant file snakes, but this is now heavily disputed.

The following genera are known:

- †Amananulam McCartney, Roberts, Tapanila & O'Leary, 2017
- †Indophis Rage & Prasad 1992
- †Kelyophis Laduke et al., 2010
- †Nessovophis Averianov, 1997
- †Nigerophis Rage, 1975
- †Nubianophis Rage & Werner, 1999
- †Woutersophis Rage, 1980

There is some debate over whether Indophis (and the similar Kelyophis) represent nigerophiids or not.
