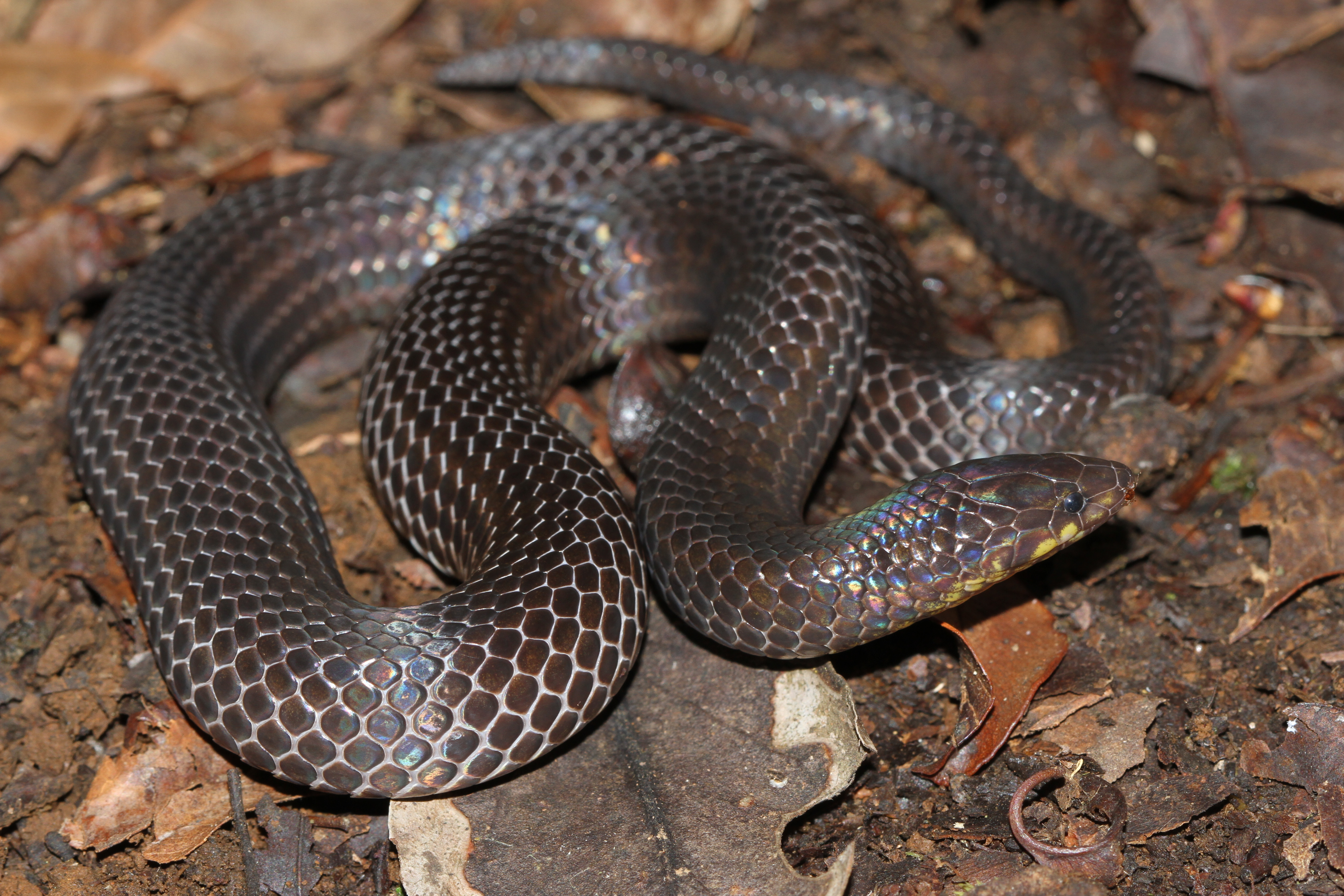

Conservation status
- Least Concern (IUCN 3.1)

Scientific classification
- Kingdom: Animalia
- Phylum: Chordata
- Class: Reptilia
- Order: Squamata
- Suborder: Serpentes
- Family: Pareidae
- Subfamily: Xylophiinae
- Genus: Xylophis
- Species: X. perroteti

Binomial name
- Xylophis perroteti (A.M.C. Duméril, Bibron & A.H.A. Duméril, 1854)

Synonyms
- Platypteryx perroteti A.M.C. Duméril, Bibron & A.H.A. Duméril, 1854; Geophis perroteti (A.M.C. Duméril, Bibron & A.H.A. Duméril, 1854); Rhabdosoma microcephalum Günther, 1858; Geophis microcephalus (Günther, 1858)

= Xylophis perroteti =

Species of snake

Xylophis perroteti, commonly known as Perrotet's mountain snake from the Nilgiris

Xylophis perroteti, commonly known as Perrotet's mountain snake and the striped narrow-headed snake, is a species of nonvenomous snake in the subfamily Xylophiinae of the family Pareidae. The species is endemic to the Western Ghats of India.

== Etymology ==
Both the specific name, perroteti, and the common name, Perrotet's mountain snake, are in honor of French naturalist George Samuel Perrottet.

== Description ==
Xylophis perroteti may attain a total length (tail included) of 62 cm (24 in). Dorsally, it is dark brown, with more or less distinct black stripes. There is some yellow on the lips and the neck. Ventrally, it is yellowish, marked with black, or almost entirely black. The dorsal scales are in 13 rows at midbody. The ventrals number 139–147. The subcaudals number 27–38 in males, and 16–20 in females.

== Geographic distribution ==
Xylophis perroteti is found in the Western Ghats in the Indian states of Kerala and Tamil Nadu.

== Habitat ==
The natural habitat of Xylophis perroteti is forest at altitudes of 1,500–2,380 m (4,920–7,810 ft).

== Behavior ==
Xylophis perroteti is terrestrial and fossorial, foraging in the leaf litter of the forest.

== Diet ==
Xylophis perroteti preys predominately upon earthworms.

== Reproduction ==
Xylophis perroteti is oviparous.
