= Xenophidion acanthognathus =

Conservation status
- Data Deficient (IUCN 3.1)

Scientific classification
- Kingdom: Animalia
- Phylum: Chordata
- Class: Reptilia
- Order: Squamata
- Suborder: Serpentes
- Family: Xenophidiidae
- Genus: Xenophidion
- Species: X. acanthognathus

Binomial name
- Xenophidion acanthognathus Günther & Manthey, 1995

Species of snake

Xenophidion acanthognathus, also known as the Bornean spine-jawed snake, is a species of snake in the monotypic family Xenophidiidae.

It is found in Sabah and Sarawak on the island of Borneo, Malaysia.

A skink (Sphenomorphus sp.) is one of the known food items of the species.
