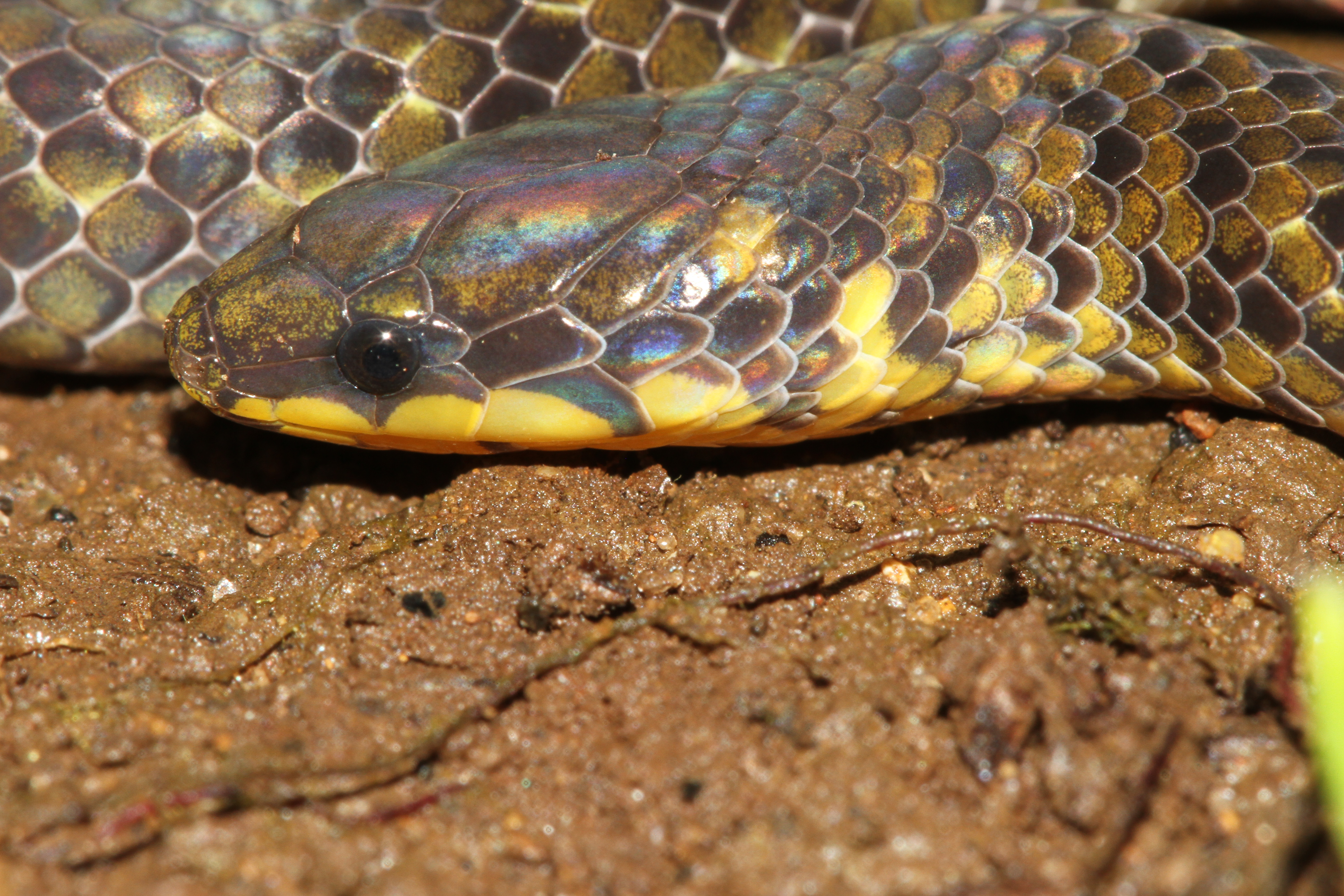
- From Munnar, Kerala, India

Scientific classification
- Kingdom: Animalia
- Phylum: Chordata
- Order: Squamata
- Suborder: Serpentes
- Family: Pareidae
- Subfamily: Xylophiinae
- Genus: Xylophis
- Species: X. mosaicus

Binomial name
- Xylophis mosaicus Deepak, Narayanan, Das, Rajkumar, Easa, Sreejith, & Gower, 2020

= Xylophis mosaicus =

Species of snake

Xylophis mosaicus, the Anamalai wood snake, is a species of snake in the family Pareidae. The species is non-venomous and is endemic to the Western Ghats of India.

== Geographic range ==
X. mosaicus is found in the Anamalai region of the Western Ghats in the Indian states of Kerala and Tamil Nadu.
