= Xylophis stenorhynchus =

Günther's mountain snake

Conservation status
- Data Deficient (IUCN 3.1)

Scientific classification
- Kingdom: Animalia
- Phylum: Chordata
- Class: Reptilia
- Order: Squamata
- Suborder: Serpentes
- Family: Pareidae
- Subfamily: Xylophiinae
- Genus: Xylophis
- Species: X. stenorhynchus

Binomial name
- Xylophis stenorhynchus (Günther, 1875)

Synonyms
- Geophis stenorhynchus Günther, 1875; Xylophis indicus Beddome, 1878

Species of snake

Xylophis stenorhynchus (Günther's mountain snake) is a non-venomous species of snake found in the Western Ghats of India.

The status of Xylophis indicus as a junior synonym of X. stenorhynchus is tentative as it is only known from one specimen collected more than a century ago. However, there has been a tentative recent sighting from the Meghamalai Wildlife Sanctuary.
