= George Samuel Perrottet =

French botanist

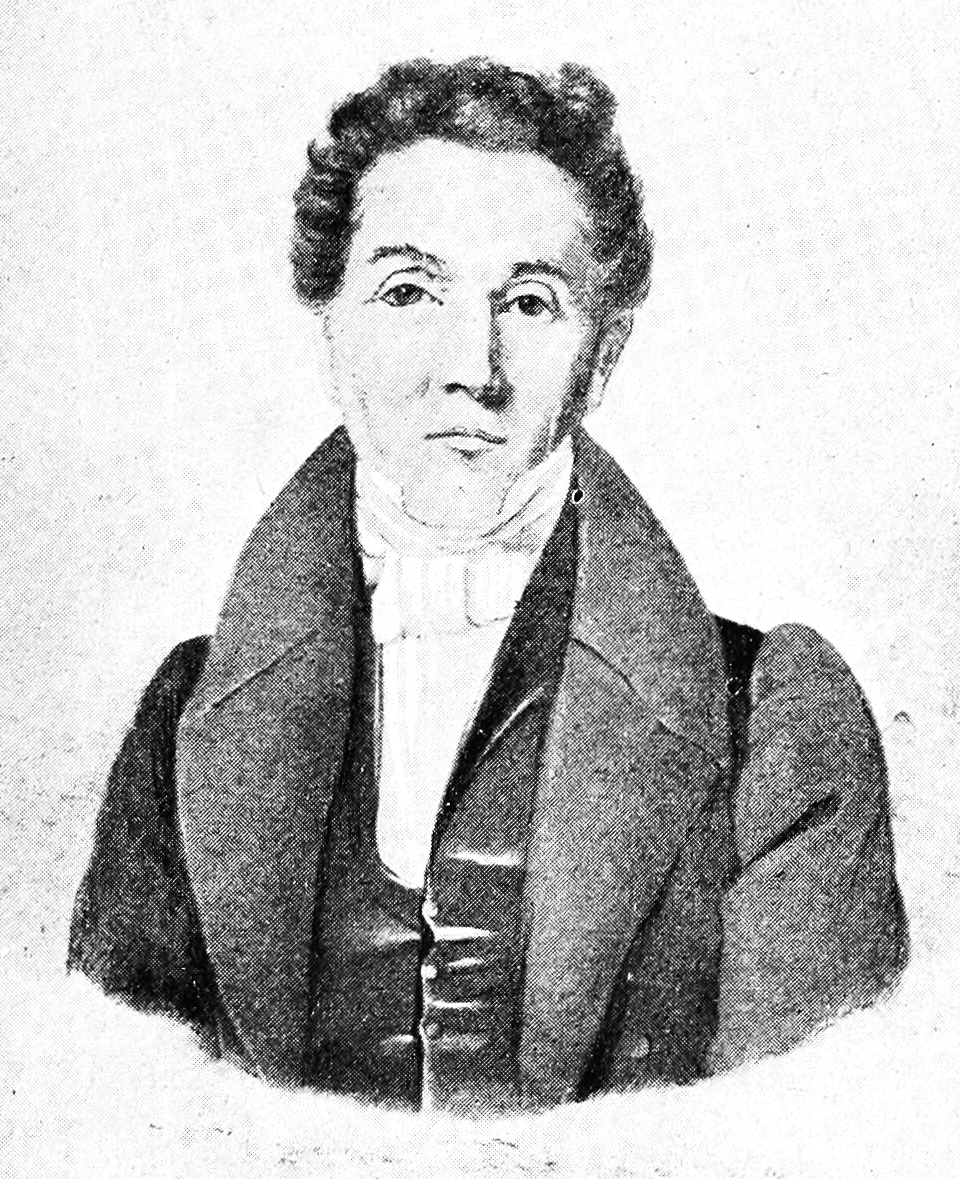
Portrait sketch of Perrottet c. 1834

George Samuel Perrottet (23 February 1790 – 13 January 1870, Pondicherry), also known as Georges Guerrard-Samuel Perrottet, was a botanist and horticulturalist from Praz, in the commune of Vully-le-Bas, today Mont-Vully, Switzerland. After expeditions in Africa and Southeast Asia where he collected plant and animal specimens, he worked in French Pondicherry, India, where he established a botanical garden. He took a special interest in plants of economic importance and was involved in the activities of acclimatisation societies in the various colonies of France. Many of his zoological specimens, sent to museums in France, were examined by other naturalists and named after him.

== Career ==
Perrottet worked as a gardener at the Jardin des plantes in Paris, and in 1819–21 served as a naturalist on an expedition commanded by Naval Captain Pierre Henri Philibert. Perrottet's duties on the journey involved collecting plants in Réunion, Java, and the Philippines for re-plantation and cultivation in French Guiana.

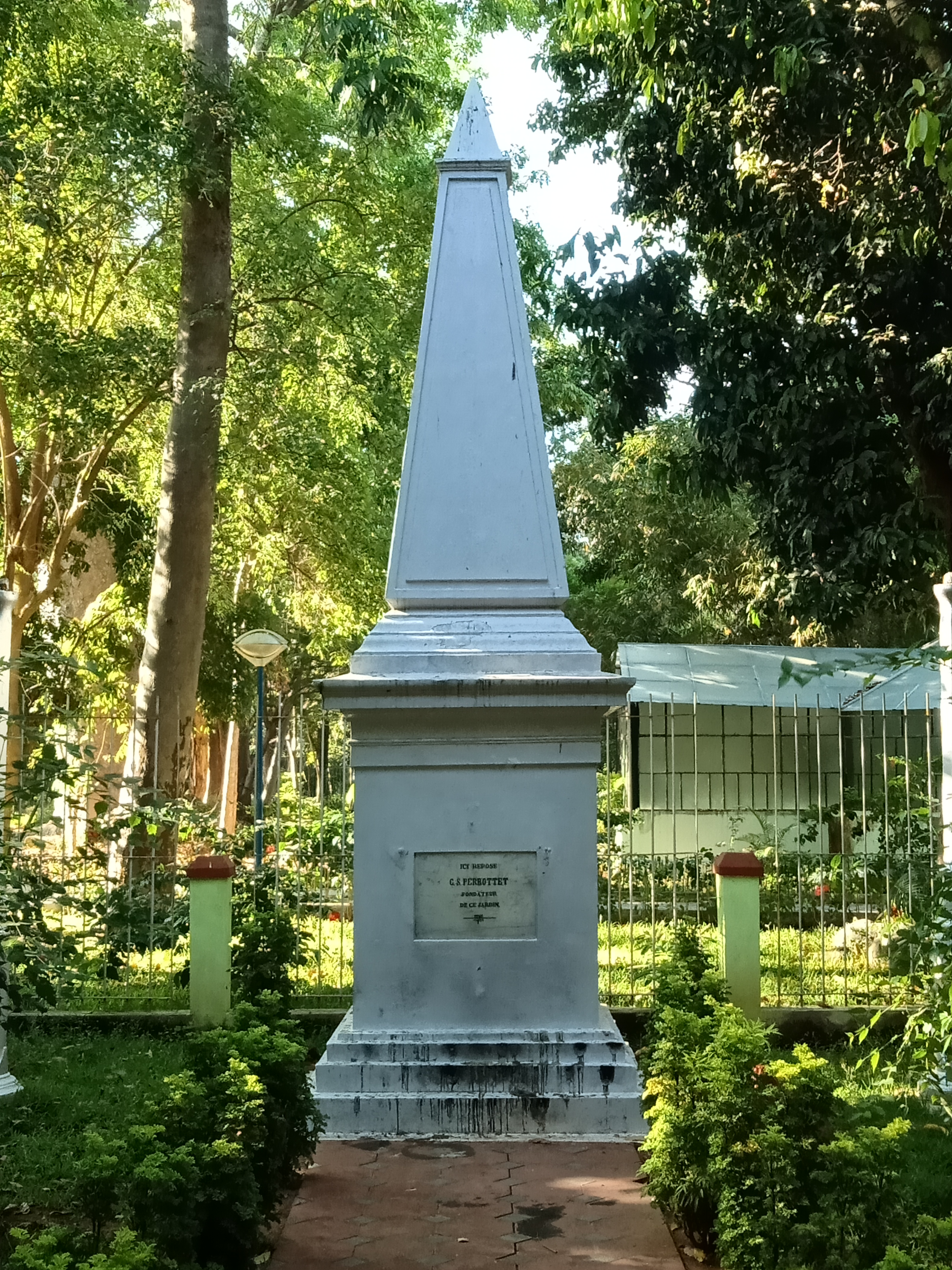
Grave and memorial to Perrottet, Pondicherry

From 1824 to 1829 he explored Senegambia, a region of West Africa between the Senegal and Gambia Rivers, while also serving as administrator of "Sénégalaise", a government outpost and trading company. Prior to returning to France in 1829, he explored Gorée Island and Cape Verde. With Jean Baptiste Antoine Guillemin (1796–1842) and Achille Richard (1794–1852), he published a work on the flora of Senegambia called Florae Senegambiae Tentamen (1830–1833), with its illustrative work being done by Joseph Decaisne (1807–1882).

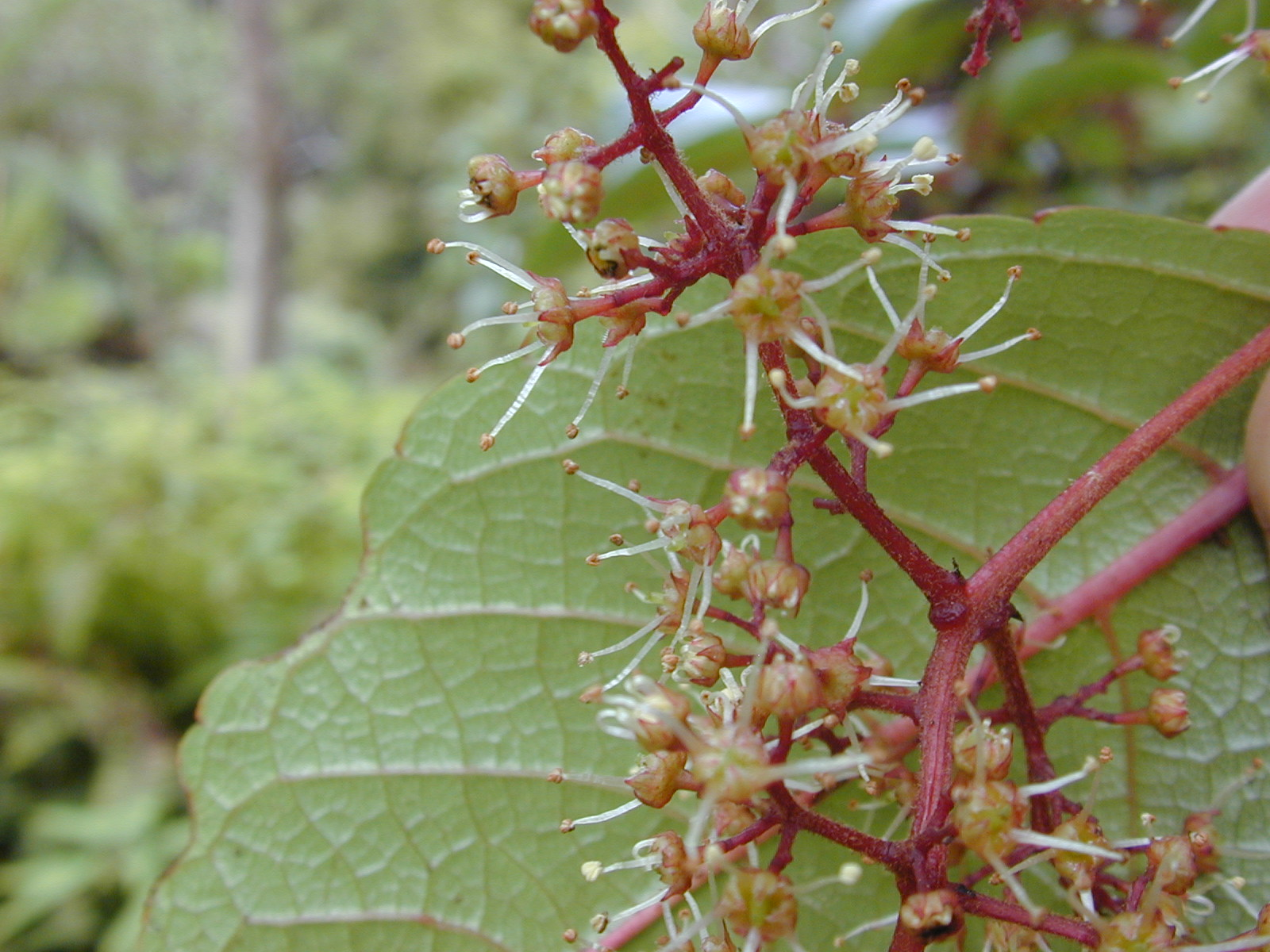
Perrottetia sandwicensis

In 1832 Perrottet was appointed correspondent of the Museum National d'Histoire Naturelle in Paris, and from 1834 to 1839 was assigned to the Jardin Botanique et d'Acclimatation (garden of botany) and acclimatisation of the French government in Pondicherry. In 1839 he returned to France, where he became involved with silkworm cultivation. From 1843 until his death in 1870, he headed and established the botanical gardens in Pondicherry as they are known today. He also took an interest in moths and silkworms.

== Legacy ==
Perrottet is commemorated in the scientific names of four species of reptiles: Ahaetulla perroteti, Plectrurus perroteti, Trachylepis perrotetii, and Xylophis perroteti.

He issued and distributed two exsiccata-like specimen series, namely Plantae Pondicerianae and Plantae Senegalenses [Plantae Senegambicae].

== See also ==
- List of gardener-botanist explorers of the Enlightenment
- European and American voyages of scientific exploration
