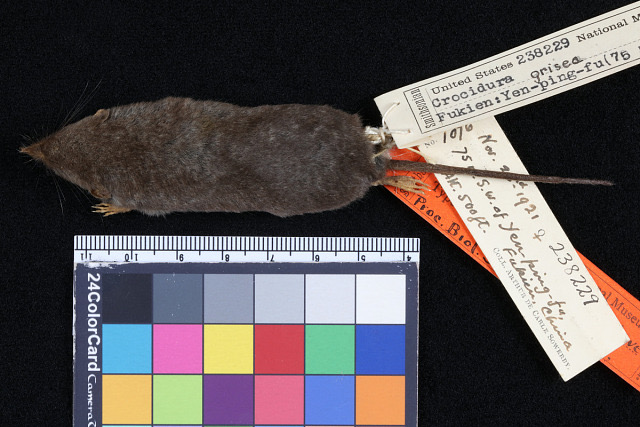
- Crocidura attenuata specimen with tail measurement

Conservation status
- Least Concern (IUCN 3.1)

Scientific classification
- Kingdom: Animalia
- Phylum: Chordata
- Class: Mammalia
- Order: Eulipotyphla
- Family: Soricidae
- Genus: Crocidura
- Species: C. attenuata

Binomial name
- Crocidura attenuata Milne-Edwards, 1872
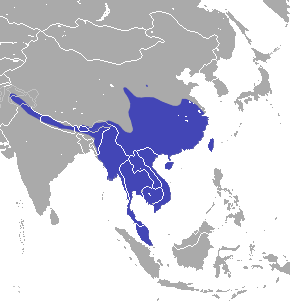
- Asian gray shrew range

= Asian gray shrew =

Species of mammal

The Asian gray shrew (Crocidura attenuata) is a species of mammal in the family Soricidae. It is found in Bhutan, Cambodia, China, India, Laos, Malaysia, Myanmar, Nepal, Pakistan, the Philippines, Thailand, and Vietnam. It is one of the commonest species within its range and the International Union for Conservation of Nature has assessed its conservation status as being of "least concern".

== Description ==
The Asian gray shrew has a head-and-body length of between 66 and 89 mm (2.6 and 3.5 in) and a tail typically between 60% and 70% of this length. Its weight is in the range 6 to 12 g (0.2 to 0.4 oz). The head and dorsal fur is dark greyish-black to smoky-brown and is a darker shade in the summer than in the winter. The underparts are dark grey and the tail dark brown above and mid-brown below.

== Distribution and habitat ==
The Asian gray shrew is native to southeastern Asia. It is present in Cambodia, southeastern China, northern India, Lao People's Democratic Republic, Malaysia, Myanmar, the Philippines, Taiwan, Thailand and Vietnam, and possibly Indonesia. Its altitudinal range is from sea level up to about 3,000 m (10,000 ft). It inhabits a wide range of habitat types, including lowland and montane rainforest, bamboo forest, scrubland, herbaceous vegetation, and secondary forest adjoining streams and rivers.

== Ecology ==
Like other members of the shrew subfamily Crocurinae, the Asian gray shrew is mainly insectivorous. it is a terrestrial species and active by day and by night. Its natural history has been little studied, but females carrying litters of four and five have been observed.

== Status ==
The Asian gray shrew is in many parts of its range the most abundant species of shrew. No specific threats have been identified, but in some places, it is affected by habitat destruction and introduced predators. It is present in several protected areas and the International Union for Conservation of Nature has assessed its conservation status as being of "least concern".
