= Ashok Captain =

Indian herpetologist

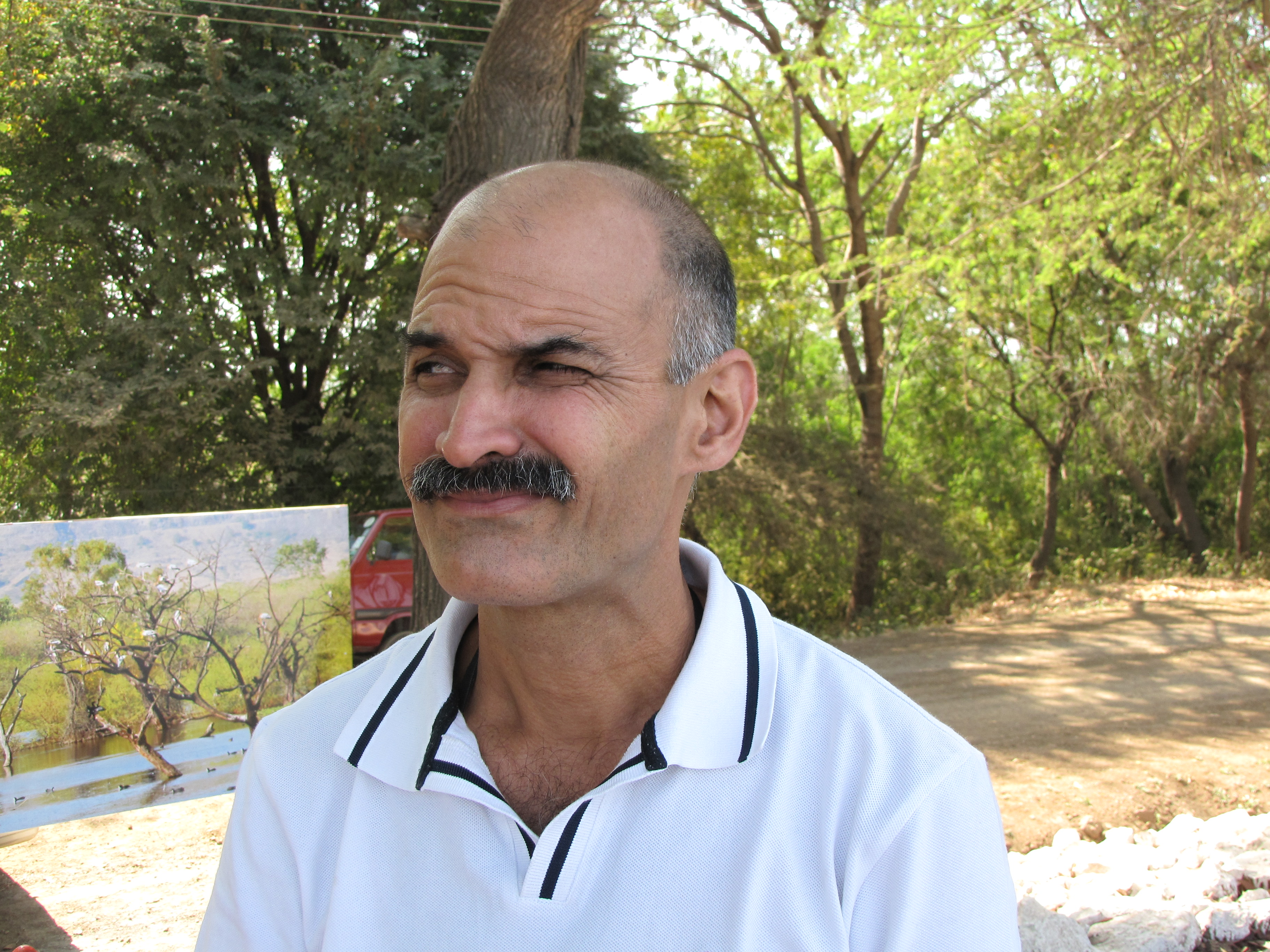
Ashok Captain

Ashok Captain (born 4 September 1960) is an Indian herpetologist who has authored books and papers on Indian snakes. He was also a competing cyclist from 1977 to 1989.

== Eponyms ==
Captain's wood snake (Xylophis captaini) and Ashok's bronzeback tree snake (Dendrelaphis ashoki) have been named after Ashok Captain.

== Publications ==
Works by Ashok Captain include:

- Whitaker, Romulus; Captain, Ashok (2004). Snakes of India: The Field Guide. Chennai: Draco Books. 495 pp. ISBN 978-81-901873-0-5.
