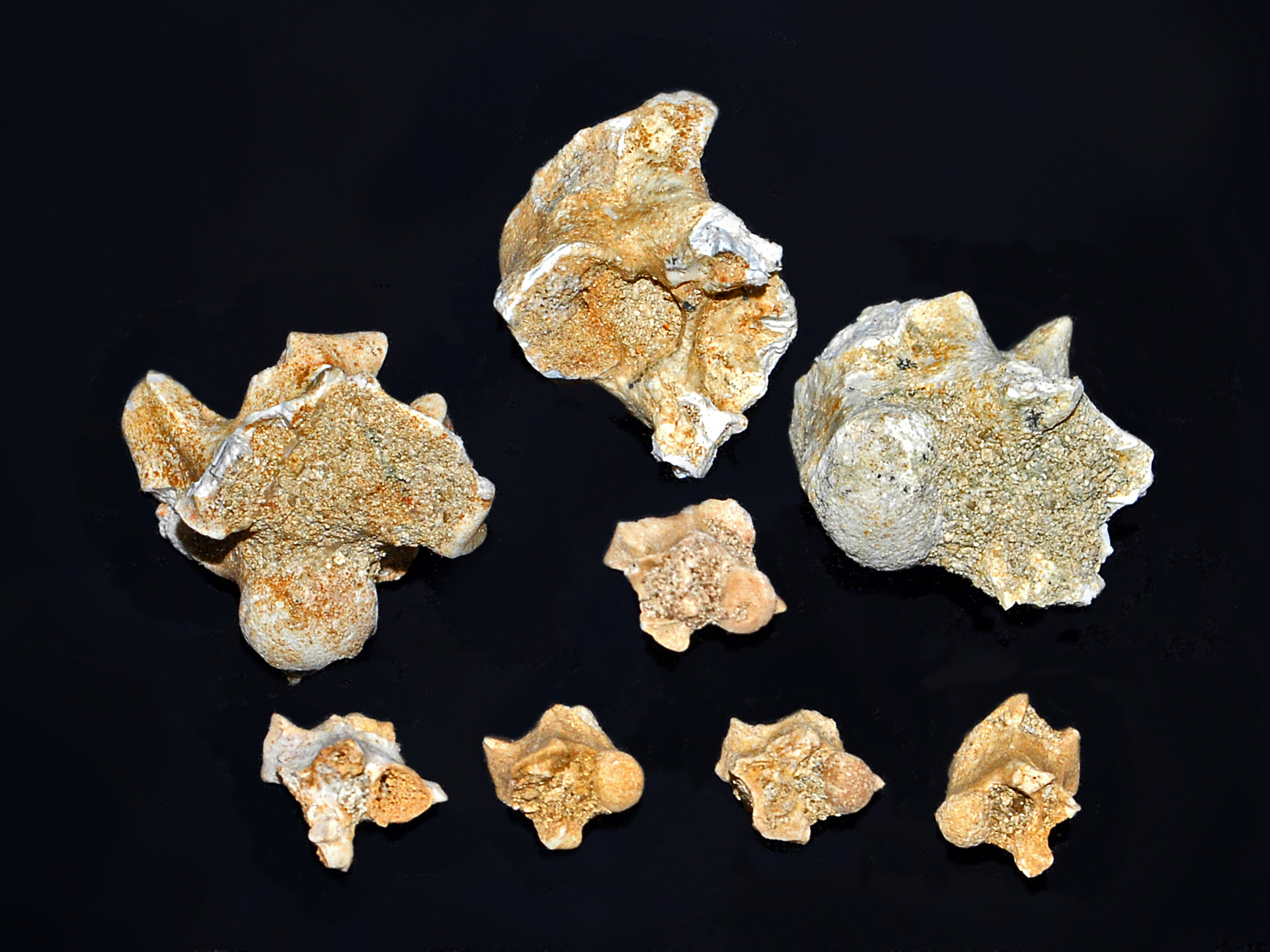
- Fossil vertebrae of Palaeophis maghrebianus from Khouribga (Morocco)

Scientific classification
- Kingdom: Animalia
- Phylum: Chordata
- Class: Reptilia
- Order: Squamata
- Suborder: Serpentes
- Superfamily: Acrochordoidea
- Family: †Palaeophiidae; Lydekker 1888

= Palaeophiidae =

Palaeophiidae Temporal range: Late Cretaceous-Late Eocene ~70.6–33.9 Ma

Extinct family of snakes

Palaeophiidae is an extinct family of marine snake within the infraorder Alethinophidia.

Species within this family lived from the Late Cretaceous to the Late Eocene, approximately from 70.6 to 33.9 million years ago. Phylogenetic analysis has proposed them as being related to the extant file snakes (family Acrochordidae), although these results have been disputed since, and new analysis show this relationship as poorly supported. Fossil records provide evidence suggesting Paleophiidae are among the largest snakes to ever exist.

== Subfamilies and genera ==
- Archaeophiinae Rage et al. 2003
  - †Archaeophis Massalongo 1859
- Palaeophiinae Lydekker, 1888
  - †Palaeophis Owen 1841
  - †Pterosphenus Lucas 1898
