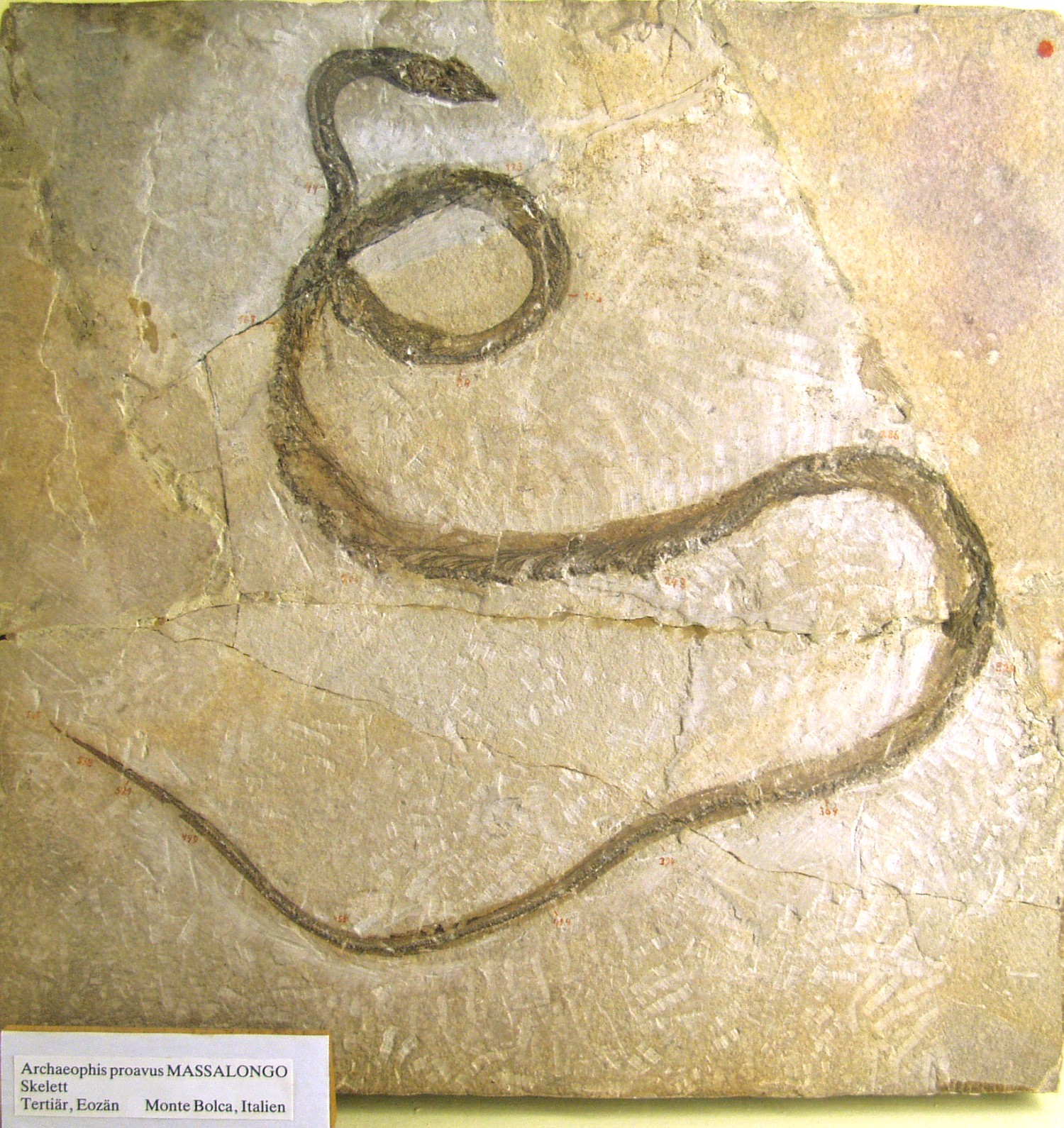

Scientific classification
- Domain: Eukaryota
- Kingdom: Animalia
- Phylum: Chordata
- Class: Reptilia
- Order: Squamata
- Suborder: Serpentes
- Family: †Palaeophiidae
- Genus: †Archaeophis; Massalongo, 1859
- Species: †A. proavus

Binomial name
- †Archaeophis proavus Massalongo, 1859

= Archaeophis =

Archaeophis Temporal range: Eocene

Extinct genus of snakes

Archaeophis proavus is an extinct species of marine palaeophiid snake from the Eocene of Monte Bolca, Italy. It had the highest vertebral count known among snakes, with 565 vertebrae.

Massalongo also described a second species in the genus, A. bolcensis, but this was subsequently placed in the new genus Anomalophis. Another species, A. turkmenicus from Turkmenistan, is also thought to most likely belong to a distinct, currently undescribed genus.
