= Xenophidion =

Scientific classification
- Kingdom: Animalia
- Phylum: Chordata
- Class: Reptilia
- Order: Squamata
- Suborder: Serpentes
- Superfamily: Bolyerioidea
- Family: Xenophidiidae; Wallach & Günther, 1998
- Genus: Xenophidion; Günther & Manthey, 1995

Genus of snakes

Xenophidion is a genus of snakes first described in 1995, and the only genus of the monotypic family Xenophidiidae. Commonly referred to as spinejaw snakes, this genus is found in Borneo and peninsular Malaysia.

== Morphology and classification ==
This genus is taxonomically and phylogenetically challenging to classify, as these snakes possess several morphological traits that distinguish them from all other snake species; head scales with numerous sensory papillae, large prefrontal scales, and an upper jaw that has a spiny palatine process. They also lack any pelvic girdle vestiges, a left lung, or a coronoid bone. In 2004, cytochrome b sequencing suggested a sister relationship of Xenophidion to Bolyeriidae from Mauritius. Similar to Boyleriidae, spinejaw snakes have a jointed maxilla.

== Diet, reproduction, and habitat ==
Very little is known about this genus. Specimen dissection has revealed the presence of a partially digested skink and an oviparous mode of reproduction, but male specimens have not yet been identified. They are likely fossorial and may be under severe threat from palm oil agriculture.

== Species ==
- Xenophidion acanthognathus Günther & Manthey, 1995
- Xenophidion schaeferi Günther & Manthey, 1995
