= Snake scale =

Scales covering the skin of snakes

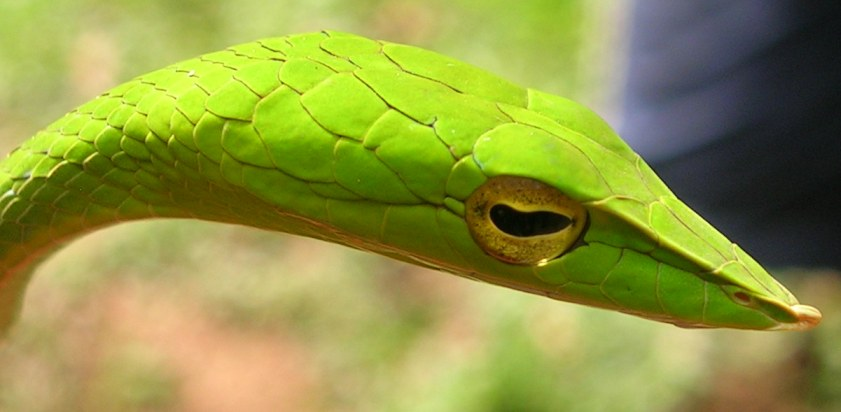
Elaborately shaped scales on the head of a Vine snake, Ahaetulla nasuta.

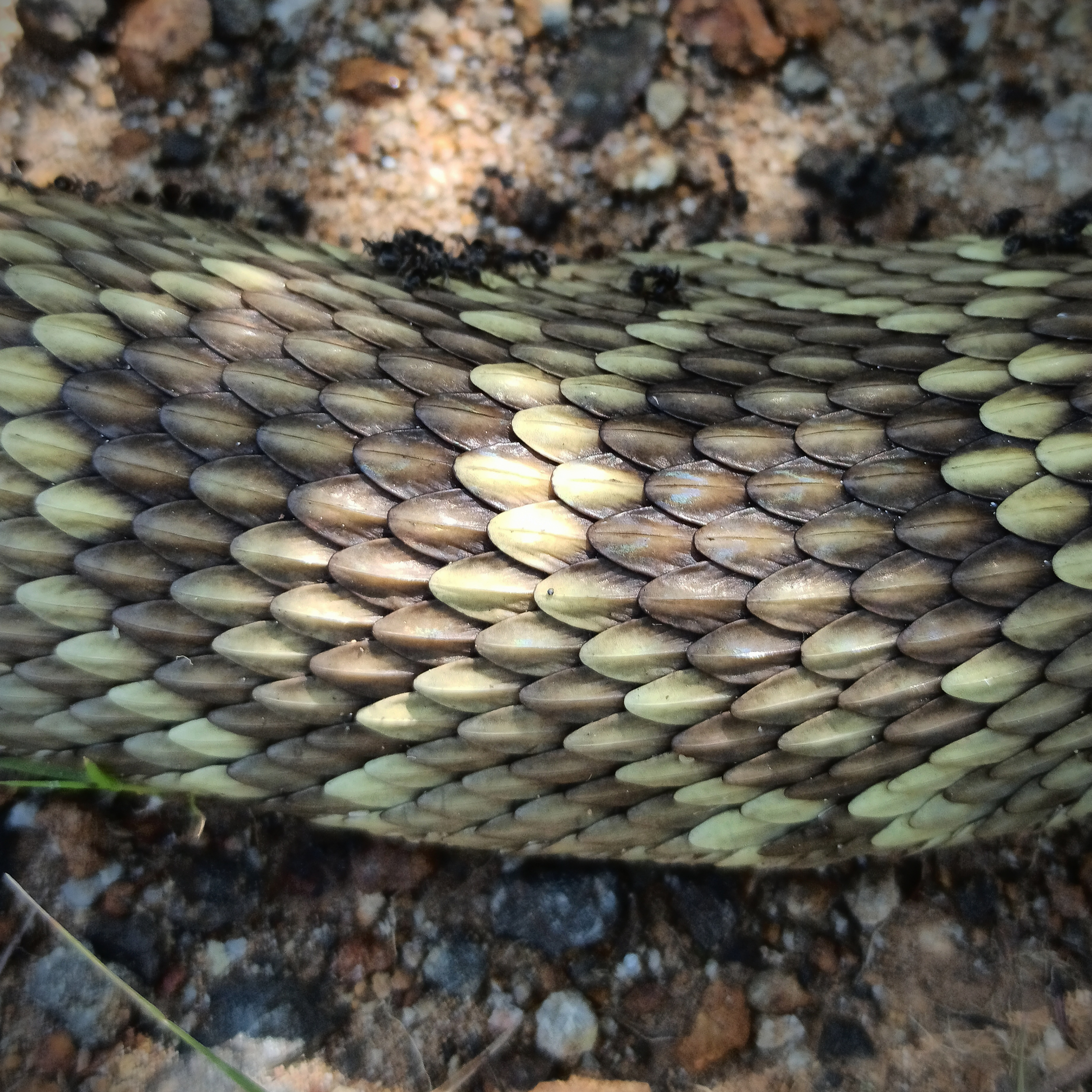
Scales of a black-tailed rattlesnake (Crotalus molossus).

Snakes, like other reptiles, have skin covered in scales. Snakes are entirely covered with scales or scutes of various shapes and sizes, known as snakeskin as a whole. A scale protects the body of the snake, aids it in locomotion, allows moisture to be retained within, alters the surface characteristics such as roughness to aid in camouflage, and in some cases even aids in prey capture (such as Acrochordus). The simple or complex colouration patterns (which help in camouflage and anti-predator display) are a property of the underlying skin, but the folded nature of scaled skin allows bright skin to be concealed between scales then revealed in order to startle predators.

Scales have been modified over time to serve other functions such as "eyelash" fringes, and protective covers for the eyes with the most distinctive modification being the rattle of the North American rattlesnakes.

Snakes periodically moult their scaly skins and acquire new ones. This permits replacement of old worn out skin, disposal of parasites and is thought to allow the snake to grow. The arrangement of scales is used to identify snake species.

Snakes have been part and parcel of culture and religion. Vivid scale patterns have been thought to have influenced early art. The use of snake-skin in manufacture of purses, apparel and other articles led to large-scale killing of snakes, giving rise to advocacy for use of artificial snake-skin. Snake scales are also to be found as motifs in fiction, art and films.

== Functions ==
The scales of a snake primarily serve to reduce friction as it moves, since friction is the major source of energy loss in snake locomotion.

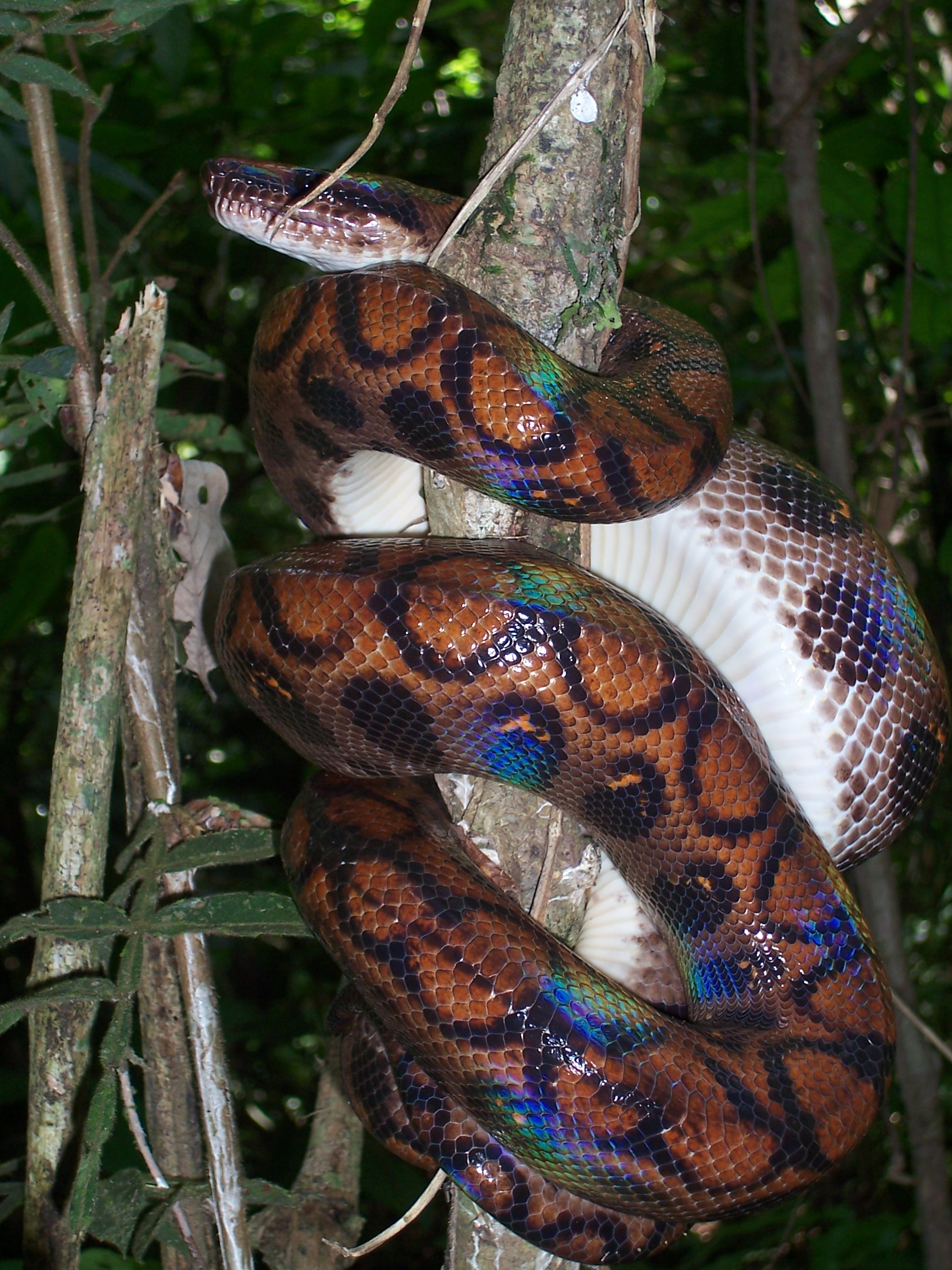
Rainbow boas get their name from the coloration of their scales caused by iridescence.

The ventral (or belly) scales, which are large and oblong, are especially low-friction, and some arboreal species can use the edges to grip branches. Snake skin and scales help retain moisture in the animal's body. Snakes pick up vibrations from both the air and the ground, and can differentiate the two, using a complex system of internal resonances (perhaps involving the scales).

== Evolution ==
Reptiles evolved from amphibious ancestors which left the water and became terrestrial. To prevent loss of moisture, reptilian skin lost the softness and moisture of amphibian skin and developed a thick stratum corneum with multiple layers of lipids, which served as an impermeable barrier, as well as providing protection from ultraviolet light. Over time, reptilian skin cells became highly keratinised, horny, sturdy and desiccated. The surfaces of the dermis and epidermis of all reptilian scales form a single contiguous sheet, as can be seen when the snake sheds its skin as a whole.

== Morphology ==
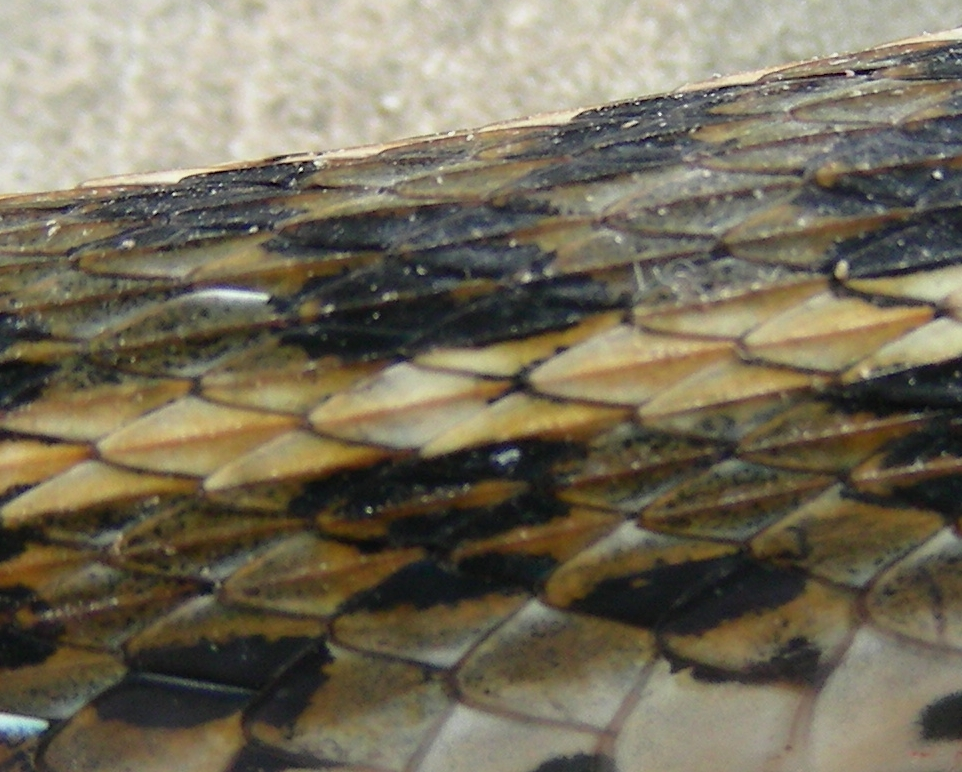
Keeled scales of the buff-striped keelback Amphiesma stolatum, a colubrid.

Snake scales are formed by the differentiation of the snake's underlying skin or epidermis. Each scale has an outer surface and an inner surface. The skin from the inner surface hinges back and forms a free area which overlaps the base of the next scale which emerges below this scale. A snake hatches with a fixed number of scales. The scales do not increase in number as the snake matures nor do they reduce in number over time. The scales however grow larger in size and may change shape with each moult.

Snakes have smaller scales around the mouth and sides of the body which allow expansion so that a snake can consume prey of much larger width than itself. Snake scales are made of keratin, the same material that hair and fingernails are made of. They are cool and dry to touch.

=== Surface and shape ===
Snake scales are of different shapes and sizes. Snake scales may be granular, have a smooth surface or have a longitudinal ridge or keel on it. Often, snake scales have pits, tubercles and other fine structures which may be visible to the naked eye or under a microscope. Snake scales may be modified to form fringes, as in the case of the eyelash bush viper, Atheris ceratophora, or rattles as in the case of the rattlesnakes of North America.

Certain primitive snakes such as boas, pythons and certain advanced snakes such as vipers have small scales arranged irregularly on the head. Other more advanced snakes have special large symmetrical scales on the head called shields or plates.

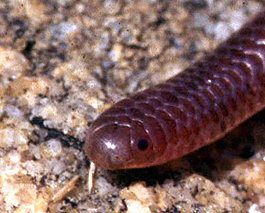
Cycloid scales on Rena humilis and other blind snake species are fluorescent, as a result when they are put under low frequency ultraviolet light (black light) they glow.

Snake scales occur in variety of shapes. They may be cycloid as in family Typhlopidae, long and pointed with pointed tips, as in the case of the green vine snake Ahaetulla nasuta, broad and leaf-like, as in the case of green pit vipers Trimeresurus spp. or as broad as they are long, for example, as in rat snake Ptyas mucosus. In some cases, scales may be keeled weakly or strongly as in the case of the buff-striped keelback Amphiesma stolatum. They may have bidentate tips as in some spp of Natrix. Some snakes, such as the short seasnake Hydrophis curtus, may have spinelike and juxtaposed scales while others may have large and non-overlapping knobs as in the case of the Javan mudsnake Xenodermus javanicus.

Another example of differentiation of snake scales is a transparent scale called the brille or spectacle which covers the eye of the snake. The brille is often referred to as a fused eyelid. It is shed as part of the old skin during moulting.

=== Rattles ===
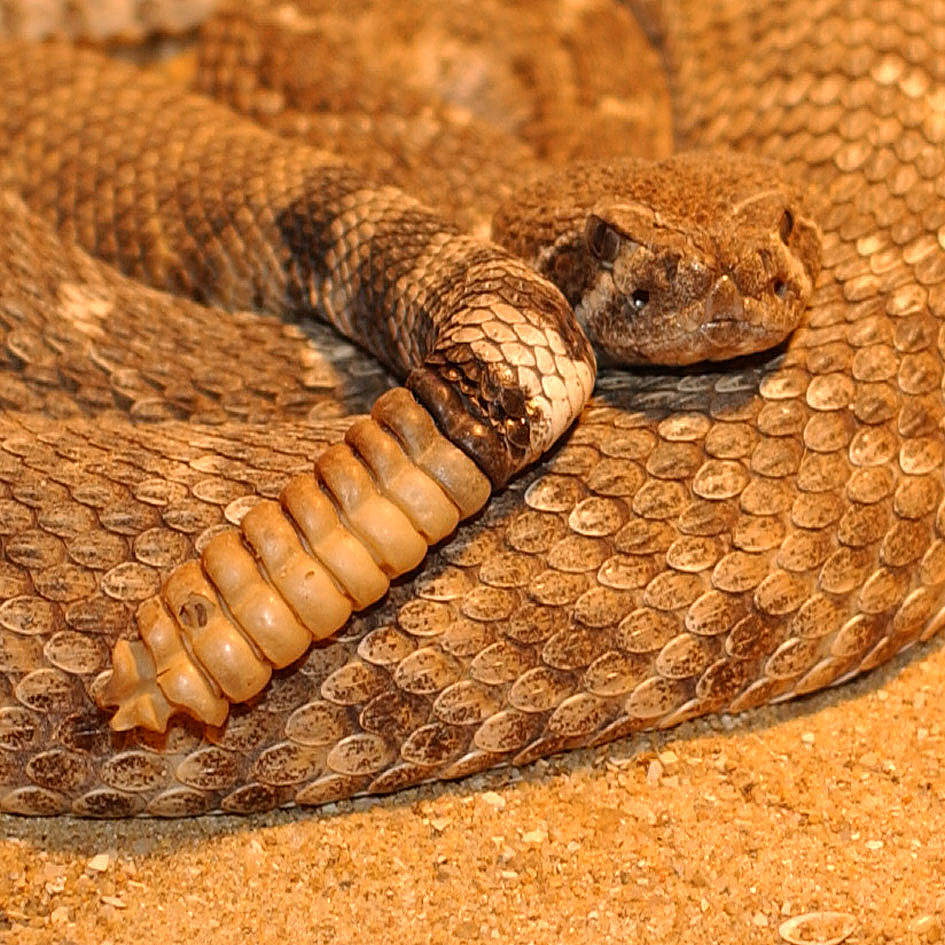
Modified tail scales form a rattle on a western diamondback rattlesnake (Crotalus atrox).

The most distinctive modification of the snake scale is the rattle of rattlesnakes, such as those of the genera Crotalus and Sistrurus. The rattle is made up of a series of loosely linked, interlocking chambers that when shaken, vibrate against one another to create the warning signal of a rattlesnake. Only the bottom is firmly attached to the tip of the tail.

At birth, a rattlesnake hatchling has only a small button or 'primordial rattle' which is firmly attached to the tip of the tail. The first segment is added when the hatchling sheds its skin for the first time. A new section is added each time the skin is shed until a rattle is formed. The rattle grows as the snake ages but segments are also prone to breaking off and hence the length of a rattle is not a reliable indicator of the age of a snake.

=== Colour ===
Scales mostly consist of hard beta keratins which are basically transparent. The colours of the scale are due to pigments in the inner layers of the skin and not due to the scale material itself. Scales are hued for all colours in this manner except for blue and green. Blue is caused by the ultrastructure of the scales. By itself, such a scale surface diffracts light and gives a blue hue, while, in combination with yellow from the inner skin it gives a beautiful iridescent green.

Some snakes have the ability to change the hue of their scales slowly. This is typically seen in cases where the snake becomes lighter or darker with change in season. In some cases, this change may take place between day and night.

=== Ecdysis ===
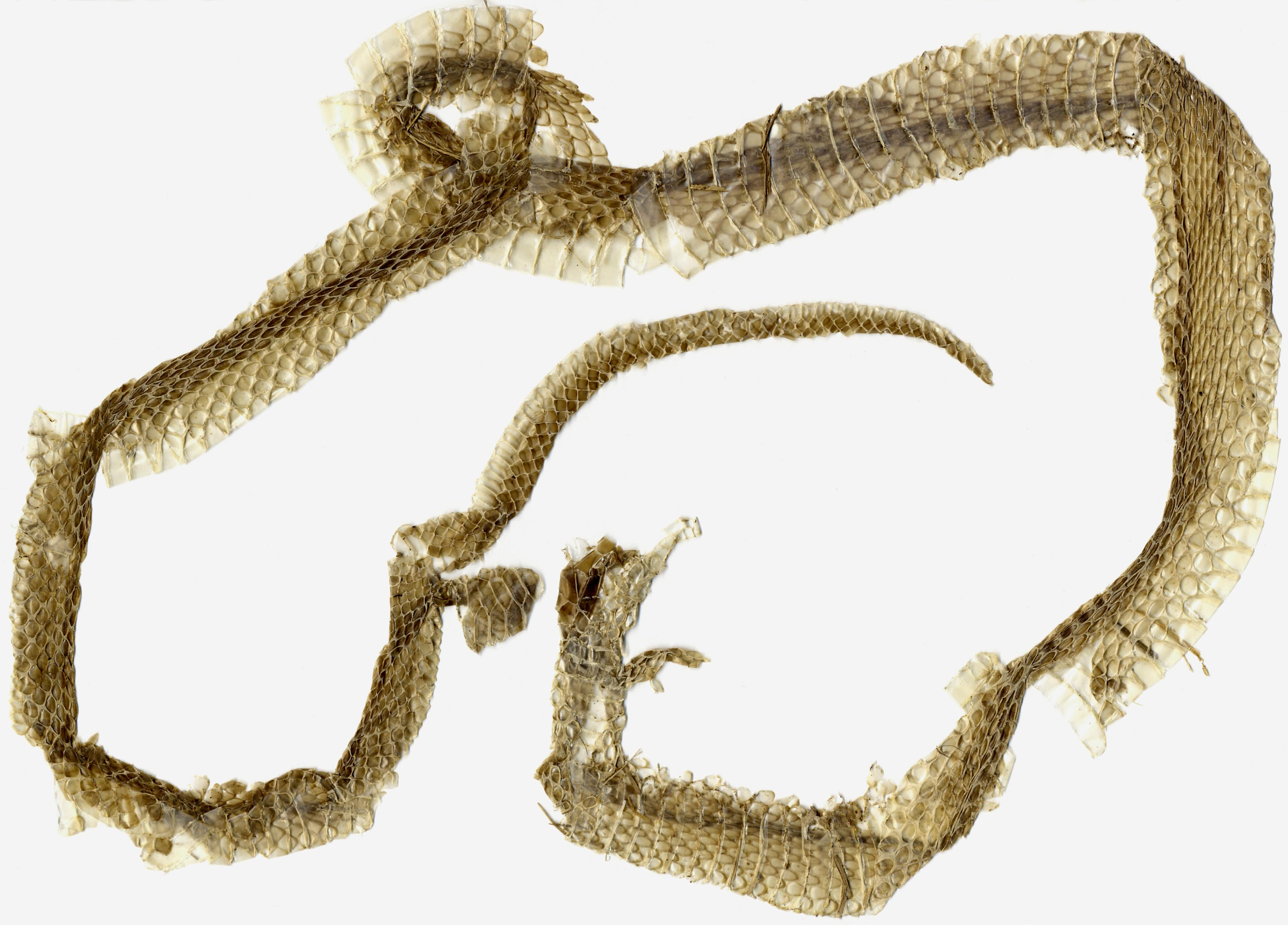
Empty skin (exuvia) of a grass snake (Natrix natrix) whose length exceeds one metre.

The shedding of scales is called ecdysis, or, in normal usage moulting or sloughing. In the case of snakes, the complete outer layer of skin is shed in one layer. Snake scales are not discrete but extensions of the epidermis hence they are not shed separately, but are ejected as a complete contiguous outer layer of skin during each moult, akin to a sock being turned inside out.

Moulting serves a number of functions – firstly, the old and worn skin is replaced, secondly, it helps get rid of parasites such as mites and ticks. Renewal of the skin by moulting is supposed to allow growth in some animals such as insects, however this view has been disputed in the case of snakes.

Moulting is repeated periodically throughout a snake's life. Before a moult, the snake stops eating and often hides or moves to a safe place. Just before shedding, the skin becomes dull and dry looking and the eyes become cloudy or blue-colored. The inner surface of the old outer skin liquefies. This causes the old outer skin to separate from the new inner skin. After a few days, the eyes clear and the snake "crawls" out of its old skin. The old skin breaks near the mouth and the snake wriggles out aided by rubbing against rough surfaces. In many cases the cast skin peels backward over the body from head to tail, in one piece like an old sock. A new, larger, and brighter layer of skin has formed underneath.

An older snake may shed its skin only once or twice a year, but a younger, still-growing snake, may shed up to four times a year. The discarded skin gives a perfect imprint of the scale pattern and it is usually possible to identify the snake if this discard is reasonably complete and intact.

== Arrangement ==
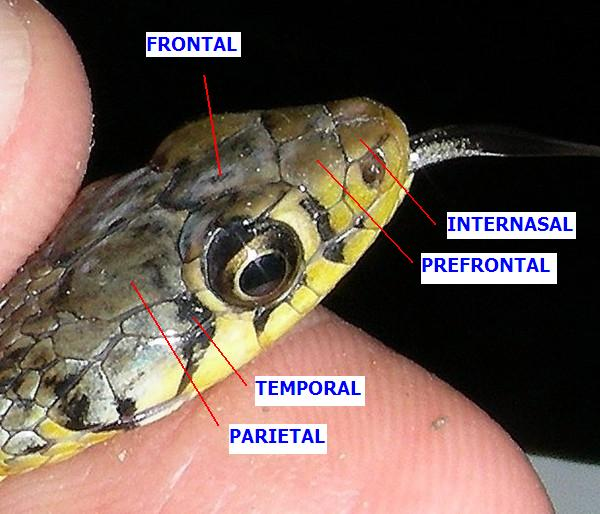
Nomenclature of head scales (top view of head)

Scale arrangements are important, not only for taxonomic utility, but also for forensic reasons and conservation of snake species. Excluding the head, snakes have imbricate scales, overlapping like the tiles on a roof. Snakes have rows of scales along the whole or part of their length and also many other specialised scales, either singly or in pairs, occurring on the head and other regions of the body.

The dorsal (or body) scales on the snake's body are arranged in rows along the length of their bodies. Adjacent rows are diagonally offset from each other. Most snakes have an odd number of rows across the body though certain species have an even number of rows e.g. Zaocys spp. In the case of some aquatic and marine snakes, the scales are granular and the rows cannot be counted.

The number of rows range from ten in Tiger Ratsnake Spilotes pullatus; thirteen in Lycodon, Liopeltis, Calamaria and Asian coral snakes of genus Calliophis; 65 to 75 in pythons; 74 to 93 in Kolpophis and 130 to 150 in Acrochordus. The majority of the largest family of snakes, the Colubridae have 15, 17 or 19 rows of scales. The maximum number of rows are in mid-body and they reduce in count towards the head and on the tail.

== Nomenclature ==
The various scales on a snake's head and body are indicated in the following paragraphs with annotated photographs of Buff-striped Keelback Amphiesma stolata, a common grass-snake of South Asia and a member of Colubridae, the largest snake family.

=== Head ===
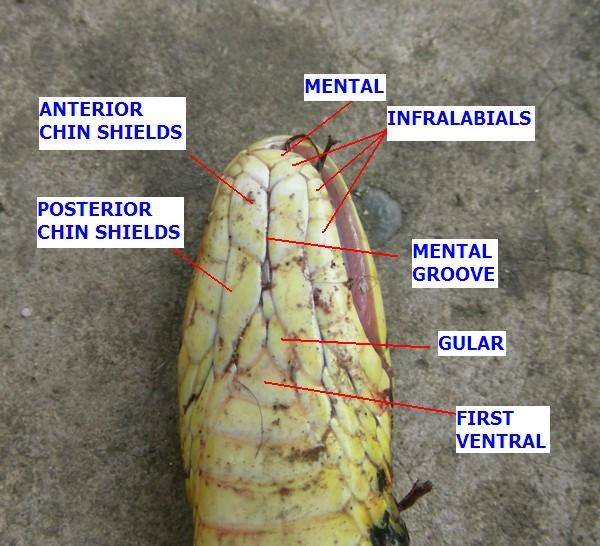
Nomenclature of scales (underside view of head)

Identification of cephalic scales is most conveniently begun with reference to the nostril, which is easily identified on a snake. There are two scales enclosing the nostril which are called the nasals. In colubrids, the nostril lies between the nasals, while in vipers it lies in the centre of a single nasal scale. The outer nasal (near the snout) is called the prenasal while the inner nasal (near the eye) is called the postnasal. Along the top of the snout connecting the nasals on both sides of the head are scales called internasals. Between the two prenasals is a scale at the tip of the snout called the rostral scale.

The scales around the eye are called circumorbital scales and are named as ocular scales but with appropriate prefixes. The ocular scale proper is a transparent scale covering the eye which is called the spectacle, brille or eyecap. The circumorbital scales towards the snout or the front are called preocular scales, those towards the rear are called postocular scales, and those towards the upper or dorsal side are called supraocular scales. Circumorbital scales towards the ventral or lower side, if any, are called subocular scales. Between the preocular and the postnasal scales are one or two scales called loreal scales. Loreal scales are absent in elapids.

The scales along the lips of the snake are called labials. Those on the upper lip are called supralabials or upper labials, while those on the lower lip are called infralabials or lower labials. On top of the head, between the eyes, adjacent to the supraoculars is the frontal scale. The prefrontal scales are the scales connected to the frontal towards the tip of the snout which are in contact with the internasals. They may have a scale in between them. The back of the top of the head has scales connected to the frontal scale called the parietal scales. At the sides of the back of the head between the parietals above and the supralabials below are scales called temporal scales.

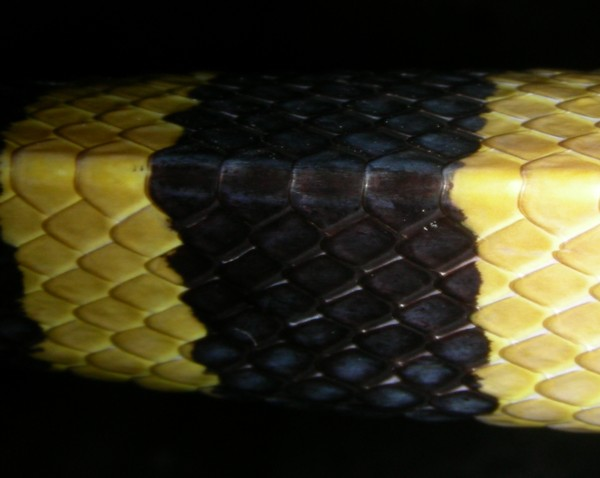
Enlarged vertebral scales of Banded Krait Bungarus fasciatus

On the underside of the head, a snake has an anterior scale called the mental (Note: from Latin mentum 'chin', not mens 'mind') scale. Connected to the mental scale and all along the lower lips are the infralabials or lower labials. Along the chin connected to the infralabials is a pair of shields called the anterior chin shields. Next to the anterior chin shields, further back along the chin is another pair of shields called the posterior chin shields. In some texts the chinshields are referred to as submaxillary scales.

Scales in the central or throat region, which are in contact with the first ventral scales of a snake's body and are flanked by the chin shields, are called gular scales. The mental groove is a longitudinal groove on the underside of the head between the large, paired chin shields and continuing between the smaller gular scales.

=== Body ===
The scales on the body of the snake are called the dorsal or costal scales. Sometimes there is a special row of large scales along the top of the back of the snake, i.e., the uppermost row, called the vertebral scales. The enlarged scales on the belly of the snake are usually called ventral scales, although several names are used in the (older) literature, including ventralia, gastrosteges (pl. gastrostegi, gastrostegia), scuta subcaudalia or abdominal scales (scutes, plates). Many authors simply abbreviate the ventral scales as "V". The number of ventral scales can be a guide to the species. In "advanced" (Caenophidian) snakes, the broad belly scales and rows of dorsal scales correspond to the vertebrae, allowing scientists to count the vertebrae without dissection.

=== Tail ===
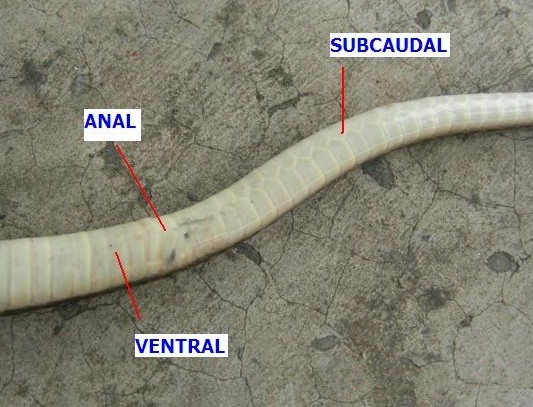
Nomenclature of scales (underside view of body)

At the end of the ventral scales of the snake is a cloacal plate that protects the opening to the cloaca (a shared opening for waste and reproductive material to pass) on the underside near the tail. This scale has also been the anal scale, which is a misnomer since it does not cover an anus but a cloaca. This cloacal scale may be single or paired. Most authors have differentiated between single and divided cloacal scales. However, based on the origin of scales during development, a scale does not spontaneously divide, but it originates as paired structures that subsequently overlap. The part of the body beyond the cloacal scale is considered to be the tail.

Sometimes snakes have enlarged scales, either single or paired, under the tail; these are called subcaudals or urosteges. These subcaudals may be smooth or keeled as in Bitis arietans somalica. The end of the tail may simply taper into a tip (as in the case of most snakes), it may form a spine (as in Acanthophis), end in a bony spur (as in Lachesis), a rattle (as in Crotalus), or a rudder as seen in many sea snakes.

Details for this section have been sourced from scale diagrams in Malcolm Smith. Details of scales of Buff-striped Keelback have been taken from Daniels.

== Glossary ==
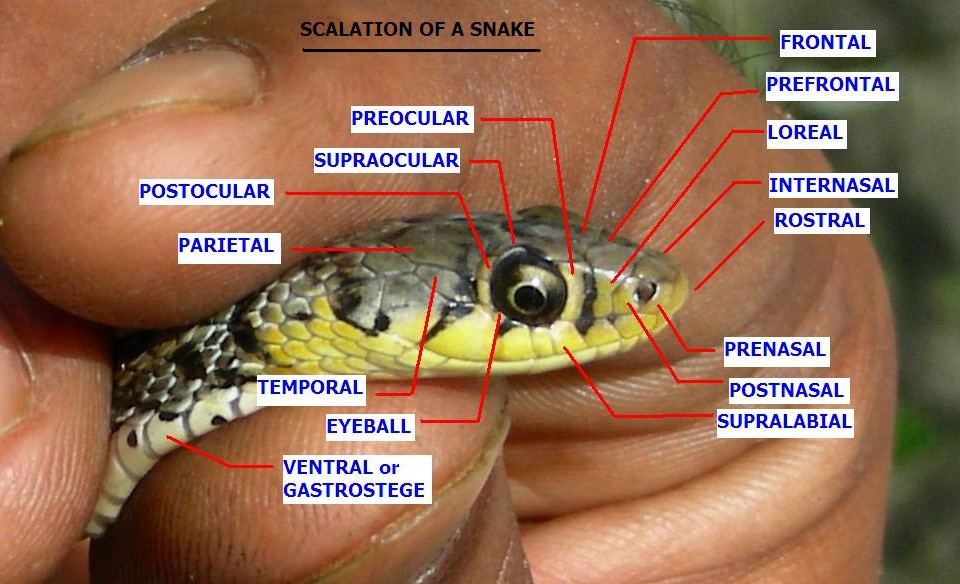
Nomenclature of scales (side view of head)

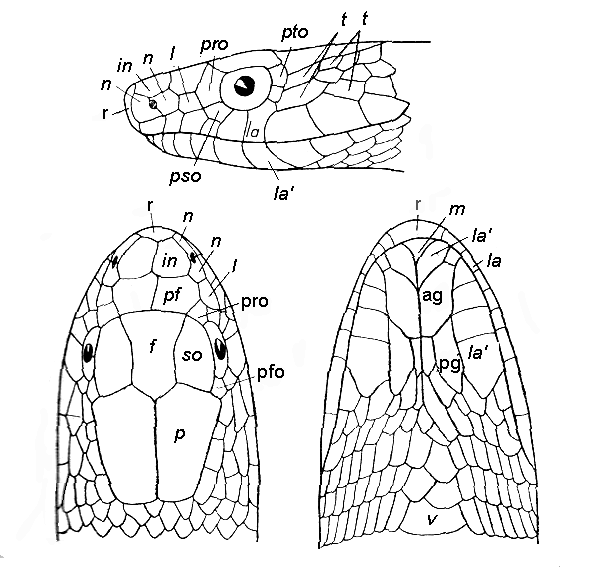
Terminology of snake head shields explained with help of line diagrams of the head of Coluber ventromaculatus from Malcolm A. Smith (1943).: ag – anterior genials or chin shields; f – frontal; in – internasal; l – loreal; la – supralabial; la' – infralabial; m – mental; n – nasal; p – parietal; pf – prefrontal; pg – posterior genials or chin shields; pro – preocular; pso – presubocular; pto – postocular; r – rostral; so – supraocular; t – anterior and posterior temporals; v – first ventral

- Scales on the head
  - Rostral
  - Nasorostral
  - Nasal
    - Prenasal
    - Postnasal
    - Supranasal
    - Fronto-nasal
  - Internasal
  - Brille, spectacle, ocular scale, eyecap
  - Circumorbital
    - Preocular
    - Postocular
    - Supraocular
    - Subocular
  - Loreal
  - Interorbital, intersupraocular
  - Frontal
  - Prefrontal
  - Parietal
  - Occipital
  - Interoccipital
  - Temporal
  - Labial
    - Supralabial, upper labial
    - Sublabial, infralabial, lower labial
  - Mental or symphysial
  - Chin shield
    - Anterior chin shield, anterior genials
    - Posterior chin shield, posterior genials
    - Intergeneial
  - Gular
- Scales on the body
  - Dorsal
  - Vertebral
  - Ventral, gastrostege
- Scales on the tail
  - Cloacal
  - Subcaudal, urostege

=== Other terms ===
- Canthus, or canthus rostralis – the angle between the supraocular scale and the rostral scale
- Mental groove

== Taxonomic importance ==
Scales do not play an important role in distinguishing between the families but are important at generic and specific level. There is an elaborate scheme of nomenclature of scales. Scales patterns, by way of scale surface or texture, pattern and colouration and the division of the anal plate, in combination with other morphological characteristics, are the principal means of classifying snakes down to species level.

In certain areas in North America, where the diversity of snakes is not too large, easy keys based on simple identification of scales have been devised for the lay public to distinguish venomous snakes from non-venomous snakes. In other places with large biodiversity, such as Myanmar, publications caution that venomous and non-venomous snakes cannot be easily distinguished apart without careful examination.

The scales patterning may also be used for individual identification in field studies. Clipping of specific scales, such as the subcaudals, to mark individual snakes is a popular approach to population estimation by mark and recapture techniques.

=== Distinguishing between venomous and non-venomous snakes ===
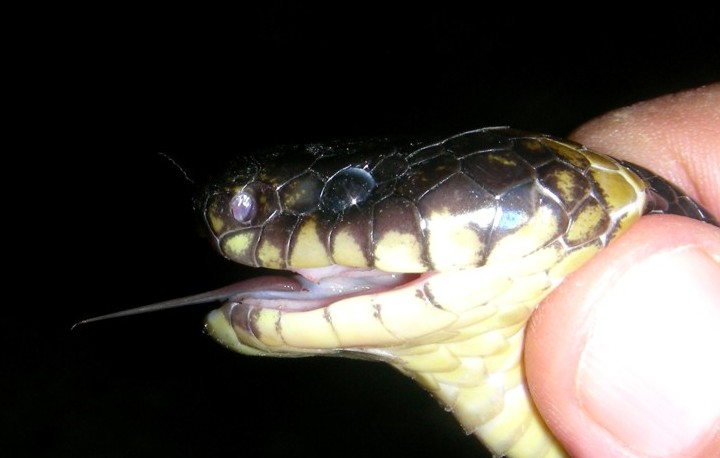
Banded Krait (Bungarus fasciatus), an Elapid, with no loreal scale between nasal and pre-ocular scales.

There is no simple way of differentiating a venomous snake from a non-venomous one merely by using a scale character. Finding out whether a snake is venomous or not is correctly done by identification of the species of a snake with the help of experts, or in their absence, close examination of the snake and using authoritative references on the snakes of the particular geographical region to identify it. Scale patterns help to indicate the species and from the references, it can be verified if the snake species is known to be venomous or not.

Species identification using scales requires a fair degree of knowledge about snakes, their taxonomy, snake-scale nomenclature as well as familiarity with and access to scientific literature. Distinguishing by using scale diagrams whether a snake is venomous or not in the field cannot be done in the case of uncaught specimens. It is not advisable to catch a snake to check whether it is venomous or not using scale diagrams. Most books or websites provide an array of traits of the local herpetofauna, other than scale diagrams, which help to distinguish whether a snake in the field is venomous or not.

In certain regions, presence or absence of certain scales may be a quick way to distinguish non-venomous and venomous snakes, but used with care and knowledge of exceptions. For example, in Myanmar, the presence or absence of loreal scales can be used to distinguish between relatively harmless Colubrids and lethally venomous Elapids. The rule of hand for this region is that the absence of a loreal scale between the nasal scale and pre-ocular scale indicates that the snake is an Elapid and hence lethal. This rule-of-thumb cannot be used without care as it cannot be applied to vipers, which have a large number of small scales on the head. A careful check would also be needed to exclude known poisonous members of the Colubrid family such as Rhabdophis.

In South Asia, it is advisable to take the snake which has bitten a person, if it has been killed, and carry it along to the hospital for possible identification by medical staff using scale diagrams so that an informed decision can be taken them as to whether and which anti-venom is to be administered. However, attempts to catch it or kill the venomous snake are not advised as the snake may bite more people.

== Cultural significance ==
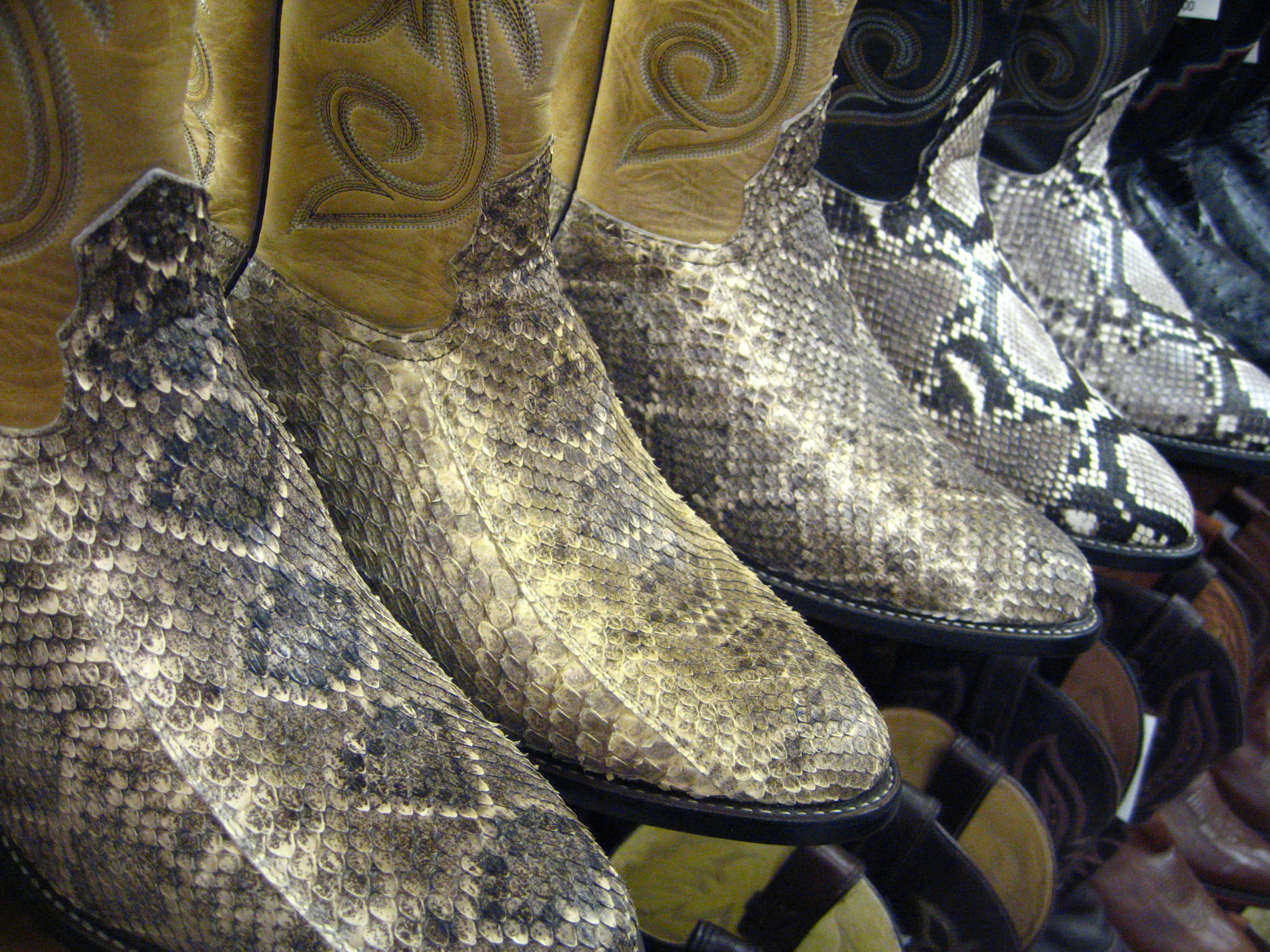
Snakeskin boots, Arizona.

Snakes have been a motif in human culture and religion and an object of dread and fascination all over the world. The vivid patterns of snake scales, such as the Gaboon Viper, both repel and fascinate the human mind. Such patterns have inspired dread and awe in humans from pre-historic times and these can be seen in the art prevalent to those times. Studies of fear imagery and psychological arousal indicate that snake scales are a vital component of snake imagery. Snake scales also appear to have affected Islamic art in the form of tessellated mosaic patterns which show great similarity to snake-scale patterns.

Snakeskin, with its highly periodic cross-hatch or grid patterns, appeals to people's aesthetics and have been used to manufacture many leather articles including fashionable accessories. The use of snakeskin has however endangered snake populations and resulted in international restrictions in trade of certain snake species and populations in the form of CITES provisions. Animal lovers in many countries now promote the use of artificial snakeskin instead, which are easily produced from embossed leather, patterned fabric, plastics and other materials.

Snake scales occur as a motif regularly in computer action games. A snake scale was portrayed as a clue in the 1982 film Blade Runner. Snake scales also figure in popular fiction, such as the Harry Potter series (desiccated Boomslang skin is used as a raw material for concocting the Polyjuice potion), and also in teen fiction.

== See also ==
- Anatomical terms of location
- Canthus (snake)
- Fish scale
- Keratin
- Moult
- Reptile scale
- Snake
- Scale (zoology)

== Bibliography ==
- Smith, Malcolm A. (1943) The Fauna of British India, Ceylon and Burma including the whole of the Indo-Chinese Sub-region, Reptilia and Amphibia. Vol I – Loricata and Testudines, Vol II-Sauria, Vol III-Serpentes. Taylor and Francis, London.
