= Anolis macrinii =

Conservation status
- Least Concern (IUCN 3.1)

Scientific classification
- Kingdom: Animalia
- Phylum: Chordata
- Class: Reptilia
- Order: Squamata
- Suborder: Iguania
- Family: Dactyloidae
- Genus: Anolis
- Species: A. macrinii

Binomial name
- Anolis macrinii H.M. Smith, 1968

Synonyms
- Norops macrinii (H.M. Smith, 1968)

Species of lizard

Anolis macrinii, also known commonly as Macrinius's anole or Macrinius' anole, is a species of lizard in the family Dactyloidae. The species is endemic to Mexico.

== Etymology ==
The specific name, macrinii, is in honor of Emil Macrinius who was a collector of natural history specimens in Mexico.

== Description ==
Anolis macrinii may attain a snout-to-vent length (SVL) of 8.5 cm (3.3 in). The dorsal scales are keeled. The ventral scales are smooth, and are two to three times the size of the dorsal scales.

== Geographic range ==
Anolis macrinii is found in the Mexican state of Oaxaca.

== Habitat ==
The preferred natural habitat of Anolis macrinii is forest.

== Behavior ==
Anolis macrinii is arboreal.

== Reproduction ==
Anolis macrinii is oviparous.
