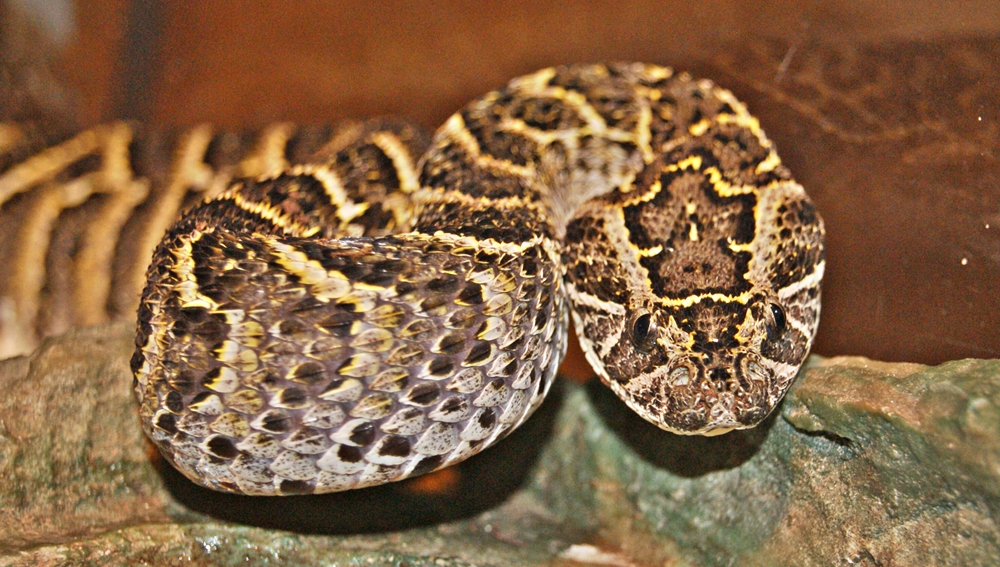

Conservation status
- Least Concern (IUCN 3.1)

Scientific classification
- Kingdom: Animalia
- Phylum: Chordata
- Class: Reptilia
- Order: Squamata
- Suborder: Serpentes
- Family: Viperidae
- Genus: Bitis
- Species: B. arietans

Binomial name
- Bitis arietans (Merrem, 1820)
- native range

Synonyms
- Click to expand: Cobra lachesis Laurenti, 1768; Cobra clotho Laurenti, 1768; Coluber lachesis — Gmelin, 1788; Coluber clotho — Gmelin, 1788; Coluber bitin Bonnaterre, 1790; Coluber intumescens Donndorff, 1798; Vipera severa Latreille In Sonnini & Latreille, 1801; Vipera (Echidna) arietans Merrem, 1820; Vipera inflata Burchell, 1822; Echidna arietans — Wagler, 1828; Vipera brachyura Cuvier, 1829; Vipera arietans — Schlegel, 1837; Clotho (Bitis) arietans — Gray, 1842; Clotho (Bitis) lateristriga Gray, 1842; Echidna arietans — A.M.C. Duméril, Bibron & A.H.A. Duméril, 1854; Bitis arietans — Günther, 1858; Bitis arietans — Boulenger, 1896; Cobra lachesis — Mertens, 1937; Bitis lachesis — Mertens, 1938; Bitis lachesis lachesis — de Witte, 1953; Bitis arietans arietans — Loveridge, 1953; Bitis arietans peghullae Steward, 1973; Bitis arietans — Golay et al., 1993; Vipera (Clotho) arietans — Herprint Int'l, 1994; Bitis arietans — Spawls & Branch, 1995

= Puff adder =

Species of highly venomous snake

The puff adder (Bitis arietans) is a highly venomous viper species found in savannahs and grasslands from Morocco and western Arabia throughout Africa except for the Sahara and rainforest regions. It is responsible for causing the most snakebite fatalities in Africa owing to various factors, such as its wide distribution, frequent occurrence in highly populated regions, and aggressive disposition. Two subspecies are currently recognized, including the nominate subspecies described here.

The species is commonly known as the puff adder, African puff adder, or common puff adder.

== Taxonomy ==
German naturalist Blasius Merrem described Bitis arietans in 1820. The specific name arietans means "striking violently" and is derived from the Latin arieto. The type locality given is "Promontorio bonae spei " (Cape of Good Hope), South Africa.

=== Subspecies ===
Subspecies	Taxon author	Common name	Geographic range
B. a. arietans	(Merrem, 1820)	African puff adder	Throughout Africa from southern Morocco down to the Western Cape of South Africa, across to the south-west Arabian Peninsula
B. a. somalica	Parker, 1949	Somali puff adder	Somalia, northern Kenya

== Description ==
The puff adder's usual size is about 1.0 m (39.3 in) in total length (body and tail) and very stout. Large specimens of 190 cm (75 in) total length, weighing over 6.0 kg (13.2 lb) and with a girth of 40 cm (16 in) have been reported. Specimens from Saudi Arabia are not as large, usually no more than 80 cm (31 in) in total length. Males are usually larger than females and have relatively longer tails.

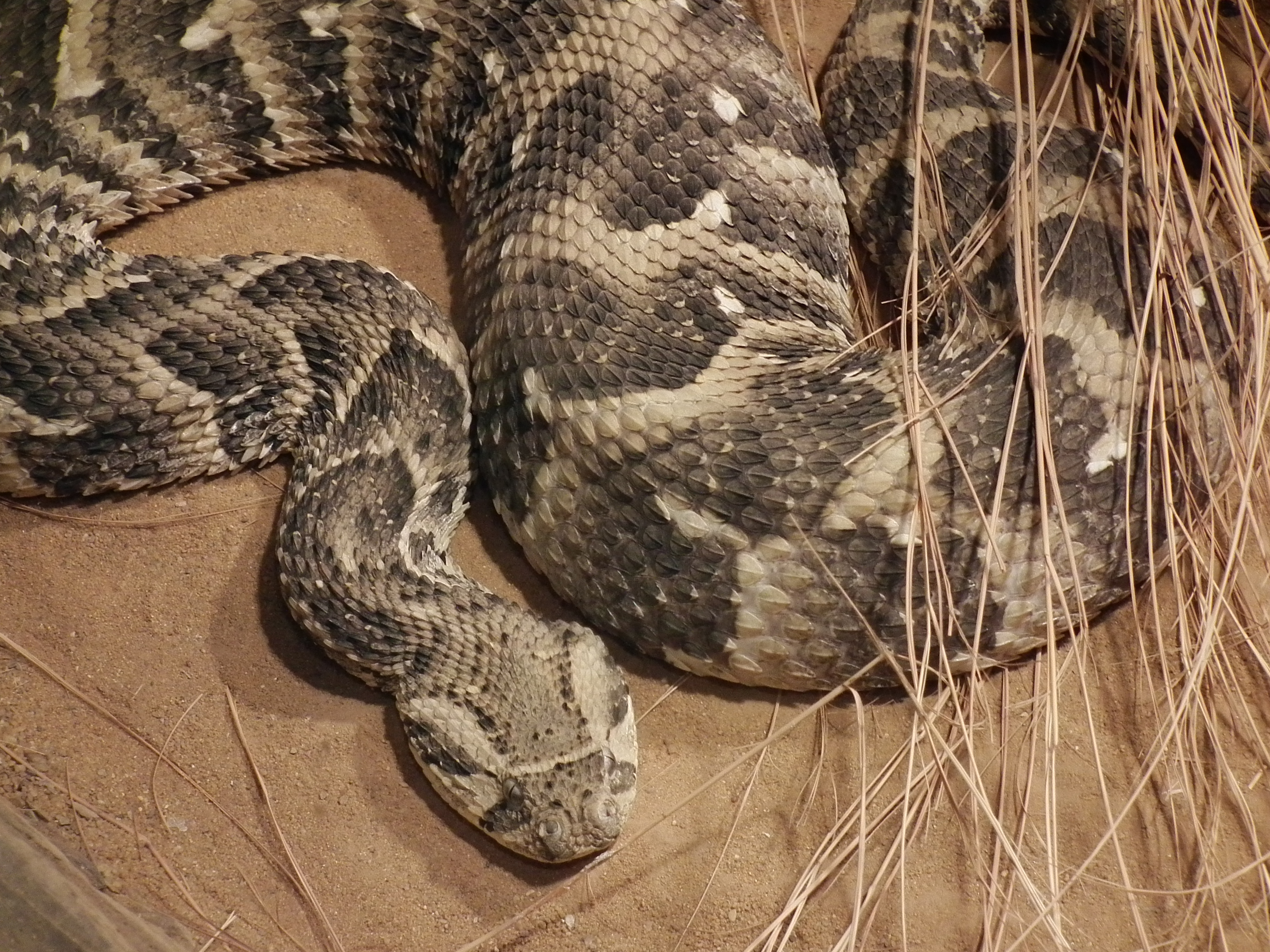
B. arietans (adult)

The color pattern varies geographically. The head has two well-marked dark bands – one on the crown and the other between the eyes. On the sides of the head, two oblique, dark bands or bars run from the eye to the supralabials. Below, the head is yellowish white with scattered dark blotches. Iris color ranges from gold to silver-gray. Dorsally, the ground color varies from straw yellow, to light brown, to orange or reddish brown. This is overlaid with a pattern of 18–22 backwardly directed, dark brown to black bands that extend down the back and tail. Usually, these bands are roughly chevron-shaped, but may be more U-shaped in some areas. They also form two to six light-and-dark cross-bands on the tail. Some populations are heavily flecked with brown and black, often obscuring other coloration, giving the animal a dusty-brown or blackish appearance. The belly is yellow or white, with a few scattered dark spots. Newborn young have golden head markings with pinkish to reddish ventral plates toward the lateral edges.

One unusual specimen, described by Branch and Farrell (1988), from Summer Pride, East London, in South Africa, was striped. The pattern consisted of a narrow (one scale wide), pale yellowish stripe that ran from the crown of the head to the tip of the tail.

Generally, though, these are relatively dull-looking snakes, except for male specimens from highland East Africa and the Western Cape province of South Africa, that usually have a striking yellow-and-black color pattern.

Puff adders have a form of olfactory crypsis, which has been shown to make detecting them difficult for trained dogs and meerkats, both scent-based predators. The exact nature of this ability is not known, but is hypothesized to be related to a low metabolic rate, as well as relocation after shedding and defecating.

=== Scalation ===
The head has a less than triangular shape with a blunt and rounded snout. Still, the head is much wider than the neck. The rostral scale is small. The circumorbital ring consists of 10–16 scales. Across the top of the head, there are 7–11 interocular scales; three or four scales separate the suboculars and the supralabials. It has 12 to 17 supralabials and 13–17 sublabials. The first three or four sublabials contact the chin shields, of which only one pair exists. Often, two fangs are on each maxilla, and both can be functional.

Midbody, the snake has 29–41 rows of dorsal scales. These are strongly keeled except for the outermost rows. The ventral scale count is 123–147, the subcaudals number 14–38. Females have no more than 24 subcaudals. The anal scale is single.

== Geographic distribution and habitat ==
The species Bitis arietans may be the most common and widespread snake in Africa. It is found in most African regions and on parts of the Arabian Peninsula.

It is found in all habitats except true deserts, rainforests, and (tropical) alpine habitats. It is most often associated with rocky grasslands. It is not found in rainforest areas, such as along the coast of West Africa and in Central Africa (i.e., central DR Congo); it is also absent from the Mediterranean coastal region of North Africa. On the Arabian Peninsula, it is found as far north as Ta'if. It has been reported to be found in the Dhofar region of southern Oman.

== Behaviour ==
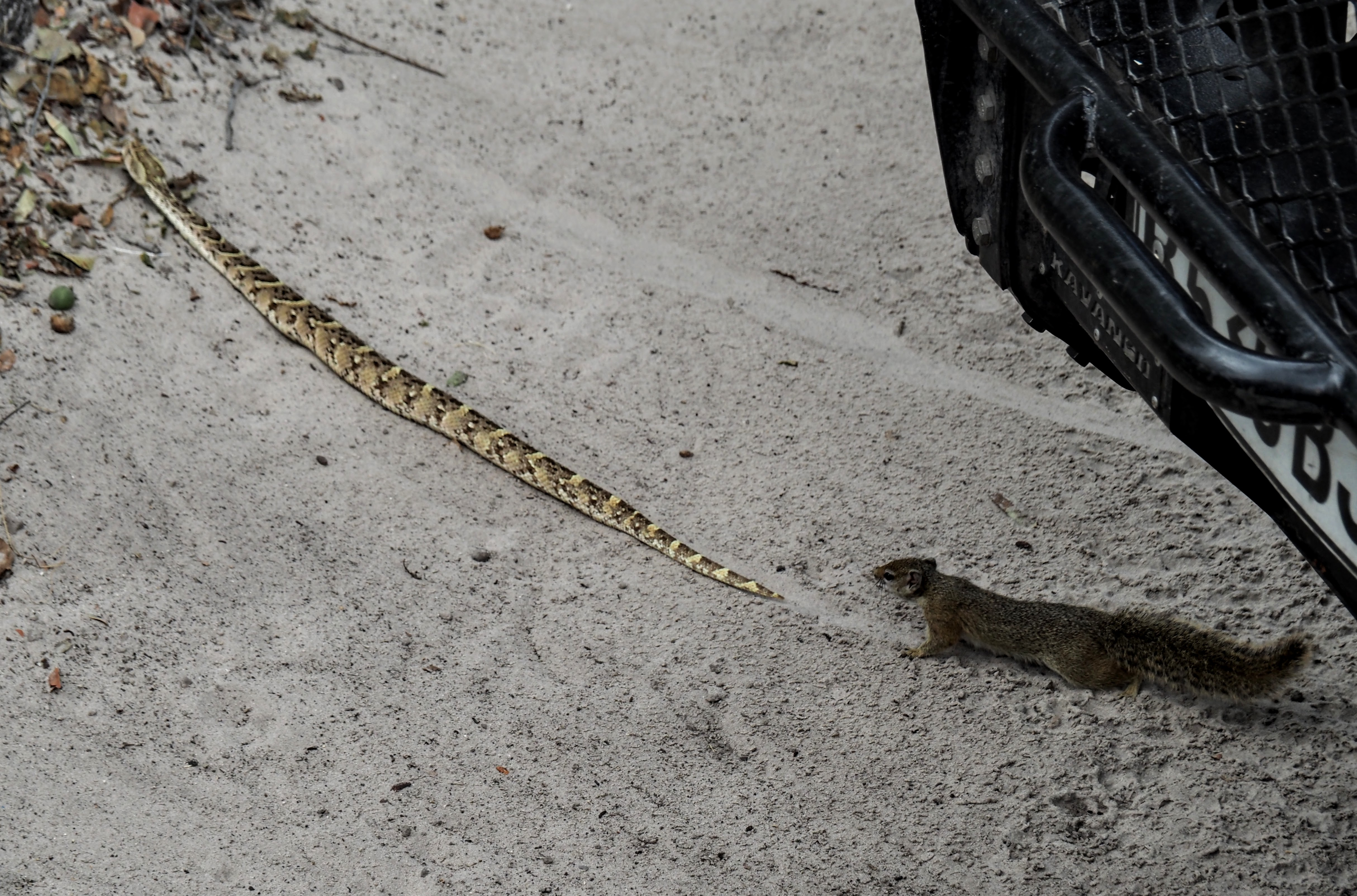
Squirrel trailing a puff adder while sounding an alarm call to warn others

Normally a sluggish species, the puff adder relies on camouflage for protection. Locomotion is primarily rectilinear, using the broad ventral scales in a caterpillar fashion and aided by its own weight for traction. When agitated, it can resort to a typical serpentine movement of surprising speed. Although mainly terrestrial, it is a good swimmer and can also climb with ease; often it is found basking in low bushes. One specimen was found 4.6 m (15 ft) above the ground in a densely branched tree.

If disturbed, it hisses loudly and continuously, adopting a tightly coiled defensive posture with the forepart of its body held in a taut "S" shape. At the same time, it may attempt to back away from the threat toward cover. It may strike suddenly and fast, to the side as easily as forward, before returning quickly to the defensive position, ready to strike again. During a strike, the force of the impact is so strong, and the long fangs penetrate so deeply, that prey items are often killed by the physical trauma alone. The fangs apparently can penetrate soft leather.

It can strike to a distance of about one-third of its body length, but juveniles can launch their entire bodies forward in the process. The puff adder rarely grips its victims, but instead releases quickly to return to the striking position.

Puff adder puffing (Greyton, Western Cape, South Africa)

== Feeding ==
Mostly nocturnal, the puff adder rarely forages actively, preferring, instead, to ambush prey as it happens by. Its prey includes mammals (rodents [Aethomys sp., Arvicanthis sp., Mastomys sp., Otomys sp., Rattus sp., Rhabdomys pumilio, and Saccostomus campestris] and even occasionally small deer), birds, amphibians (such as Schismaderma carens), lizards, other snakes, and tortoises.

== Reproduction ==
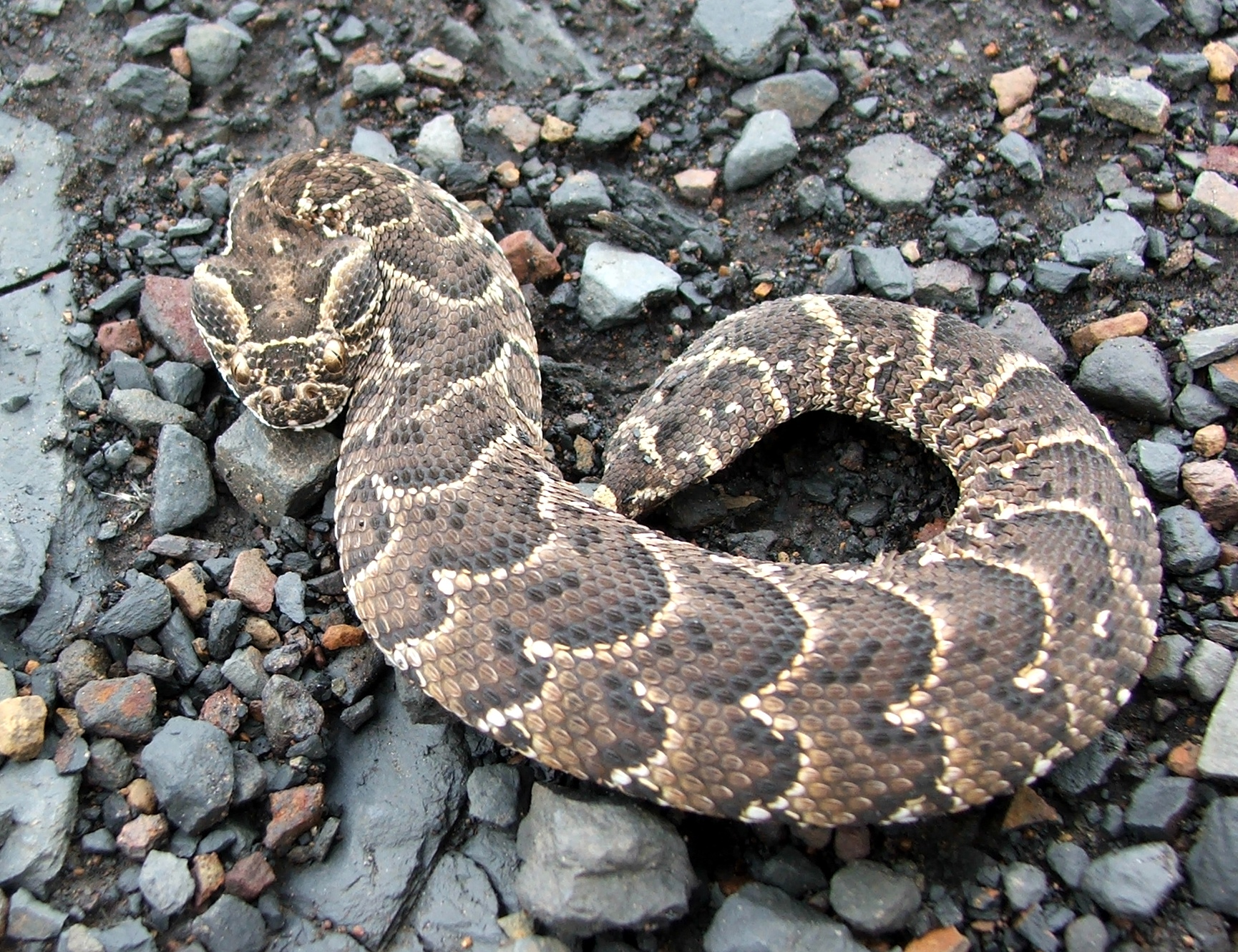
B. a. arietans, juvenile (ready to strike)

Female puff adders produce a pheromone to attract males, which engage in neck-wrestling combat dances. A female in Malindi was followed by seven males. They give birth to large numbers of offspring; litters over 80 have been reported, while 50–60 are not unusual. Newborns are 12.5–17.5 cm (4.9–6.9 in) in length. Very large specimens, particularly those from East Africa, give birth to the highest numbers of offspring. A Kenyan female in a Czech zoo gave birth to 156 young, the largest litter for any species of snake.

== Captivity ==
The puff adder does well in captivity, but gluttony has been reported, more heavily in juveniles. Kauffeld (1969) mentions that specimens can be maintained for years on only one meal per week, but that when offered all they can eat, the result is often death, or at best wholesale regurgitation. It is a bad-tempered snake, and some specimens never settle down in captivity, always hissing and puffing when approached.

== Venom ==
The species Bitis arietans is responsible for more snakebite fatalities than any other African snake, due to a combination of factors, including its wide distribution, common occurrence, large size, potent venom that is produced in large amounts, long fangs, and habit of basking by footpaths and sitting quietly when approached.

The puff adder's venom has cytotoxic effects and is one of the most toxic of any vipers based on LD_{50}. The LD_{50} values in mice vary: 0.4–2.0 mg/kg intravenously, 0.9–3.7 mg/kg peritoneally, and 4.4–7.7 mg/kg subcutaneously (SC). Mallow et al. (2003) give an LD_{50} range of 1.0–7.75 mg/kg SC. Venom yield is typically 150–350 mg, with a maximum of 750 mg. Brown (1973) mentions a venom yield of 180–750 mg. About 100 mg (1.5 gr) are thought to be enough to kill a healthy adult human male, with death occurring after 25 hours.

In humans, bites from this species can produce severe local and systemic symptoms. Based on the degree and type of local effect, bites can be divided into two symptomatic categories – those with little or no surface extravasation, and those with hemorrhages evident as ecchymosis, bleeding, and swelling. In both cases, severe pain and tenderness occur, but in the latter, widespread superficial or deep necrosis and compartment syndrome are seen. Serious bites cause limbs to become immovably flexed as a result of significant hemorrhage or coagulation in the affected muscles. Residual induration, however, is rare and usually these areas completely resolve.

Other bite symptoms that may occur in humans include edema, which may become extensive, shock, watery blood oozing from the puncture wounds, nausea and vomiting, subcutaneous bruising, blood blisters that may form rapidly, and painful swelling of the regional lymph nodes. Swelling usually decreases after a few days, except for the area immediately around the bite site. Hypotension, together with weakness, dizziness, and periods of semi- or unconsciousness is also reported.

If not treated carefully, necrosis spreads, causing skin, subcutaneous tissue, and muscle to separate from healthy tissue and eventually slough with serous exudate. The slough may be superficial or deep, sometimes down to the bone. Gangrene and secondary infections commonly occur and can result in loss of digits and limbs.

The fatality rate highly depends on the severity of the bites and some other factors. Deaths can be exceptional and probably occur in less than 15% of all untreated cases (usually in 2–4 days from complications following blood volume deficit and disseminated intravascular coagulation), although some reports show that severe envenomations have a 52% mortality rate. Most fatalities are associated with poor clinical management and neglect.
