= Brille =

Part of the anatomy of the eye in some animals

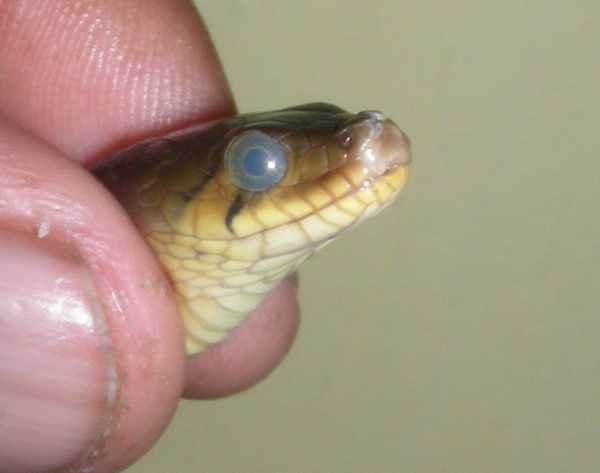
Clouded brille of a colubrid nearing moulting

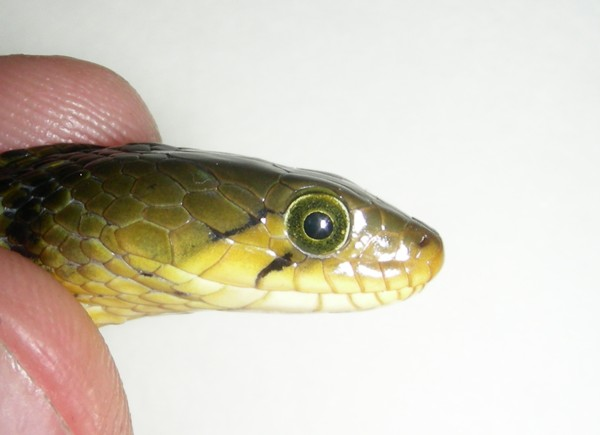
Clear brille of the same snake - 20 days earlier

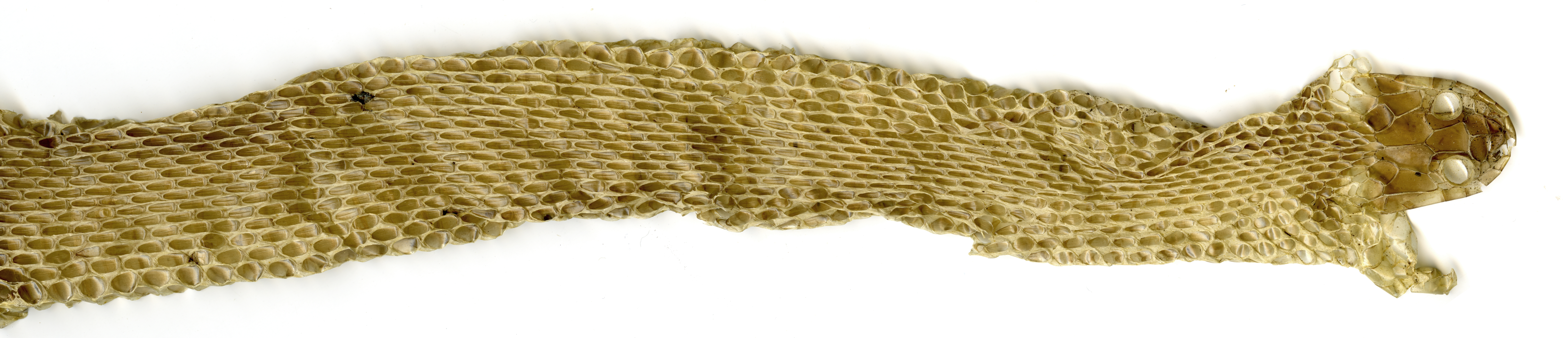
Shed skin of grass snake Natrix natrix, showing brille scales

The brille (also called the ocular scale, eye cap or spectacle) is the layer of transparent, immovable disc-shaped skin or scale covering the eyes of some animals for protection, especially in animals without eyelids. In squamate reptiles both the nictitating membrane and the eyelids have been suggested as the evolutionary origin of the brille, but embryonic studies supports the fusion of the dorsal and ventral eyelids. Brille means "spectacles" or "glasses" in German, Norwegian, and Danish.

In snakes, there are no eyelids and the brille is clear and cannot be distinguished, except when the animal is becoming ready for moulting. At that time, it becomes cloudy and is visible as a cover over the eye. When the snake moults, the brille is also shed, generally inside out, as part of its skin. The brilles protect their eyes from dust and dirt and give them a "glassy-eyed" blank appearance.

Snakes, night lizards, and some skinks have brilles. All geckos except those in the subfamily Eublepharinae (eyelid geckos) possess brilles.

Some groups of bony fish have a transparent eyelid known as the adipose eyelid. Some reptiles, mammals and birds have a translucent third eyelid that moves horizontally across the eye called the nictitating membrane.

== See also ==
- Ocular scales
- Snake scales
