= Bitis arietans somalica =

Scientific classification
- Domain: Eukaryota
- Kingdom: Animalia
- Phylum: Chordata
- Class: Reptilia
- Order: Squamata
- Suborder: Serpentes
- Family: Viperidae
- Genus: Bitis
- Species: B. arietans
- Subspecies: B. a. somalica

Trinomial name
- Bitis arietans somalica Parker, 1949

Synonyms
- Bitis lachesis somalica Parker, 1949; Bitis arietans somalica — Loveridge, 1957

Subspecies of snake

The Bitis arietans somalica, also known as the Somali puff adder or Abeeso in Somali, is a highly venomous viper subspecies found only in Somalia, eastern Ethiopia, and northern Kenya.

== Description ==
It is distinguished from B. a. arietans by its keeled subcaudals. Normally, B. arietans grows to a total length (body and tail) around 800–900 mm (about 32-36 in). In northern Kenya, Somalia, and though, they grow unusually large, reaching total lengths up to 1,905 mm (75.0 in).

== Geographic range ==
This snake is found in northeastern Kenya, eastern Ethiopia and Somalia (including Coiama Island). The type locality given is "Bohodle, 2100 ft." (Bohodle, 640 m).
