= Occipital scales =

Anatomical feature of reptiles

In reptiles, occipital scales are enlarged plates that lie directly behind the parietal scales.

An interoccipital is a scale located between the occipital scales.

== Related scales ==
- Parietal scales.

== See also ==
- Snake scales.
