= Subcaudal scales =

Enlarged scales on the underside of the tail in snakes

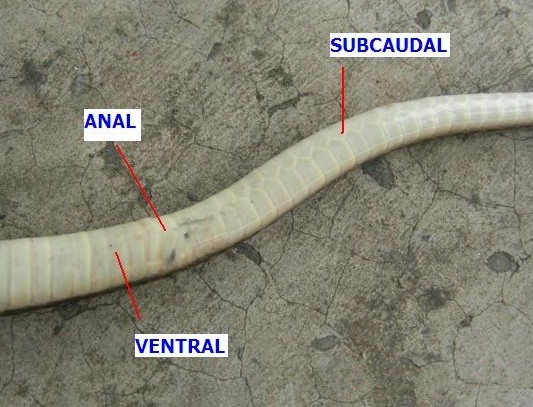
Amphiesma stolata paired subcaudal scales

In snakes, the subcaudal scales are the enlarged plates on the underside of the tail. These scales may be either single or divided (paired) and are preceded by the anal scale.

== Related scales ==
- Anal scale
- Ventral scales

== See also ==
- Snake scales
