= Keeled scales =

Reptile scales with ridges

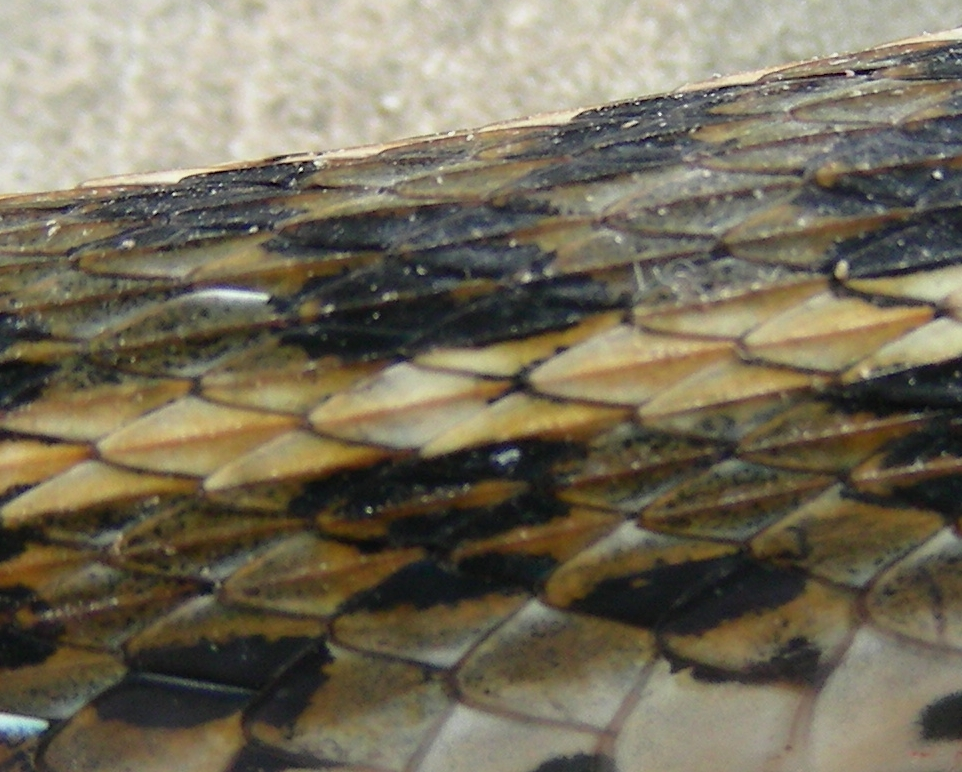
Keeled scales on a colubrid snake, Amphiesma stolatum

Keeled scales refer to reptile scales that, rather than being smooth, have a ridge down the center that may or may not extend to the tip of the scale, making them rough to the touch. According to Street's (1979) description of European lizards and snakes, in those that have keeled scales the keels are usually stronger in male specimens and are consistently arranged according to the species of reptiles, even though many others do not have them. With European lizards, the dorsal scales are usually well keeled, while those on the flanks are more weakly keeled and those on the belly smooth. Non-European lizards such as Sphaerodactylus macrolepis also display keeled scales.

Klauber (1997) describes how the keels on the scales of Crotalus rattlesnakes are particularly strong mid-dorsally, but gradually weaken on the lateral rows with the ventral scales being smooth. He then references a 1938 study, stating that it "has suggested that the keels may have an adaptive advantage in reducing shininess, that otherwise might lead to discovery by enemies."

The purposes of keeled scales are largely understudied, but some other uses may include locomotion in arboreal and grass-dwelling species. Water collection has been shown in some rattlesnakes, though the nanostructure of the scales is thought to be more significant than the macrostructure (keel) of the scales.

In some viperines, most notably those of the genus Echis, the lateral scales are not only keeled, but the keels have minute serrations. The snakes use this in a warning and threat display: the body is arranged into a series of parallel C-shaped (counterlooped) coils that they rub together continuously to produce a sizzling sound, rather like water on a hot plate. This method of making sound is called stridulation.

== Gallery ==
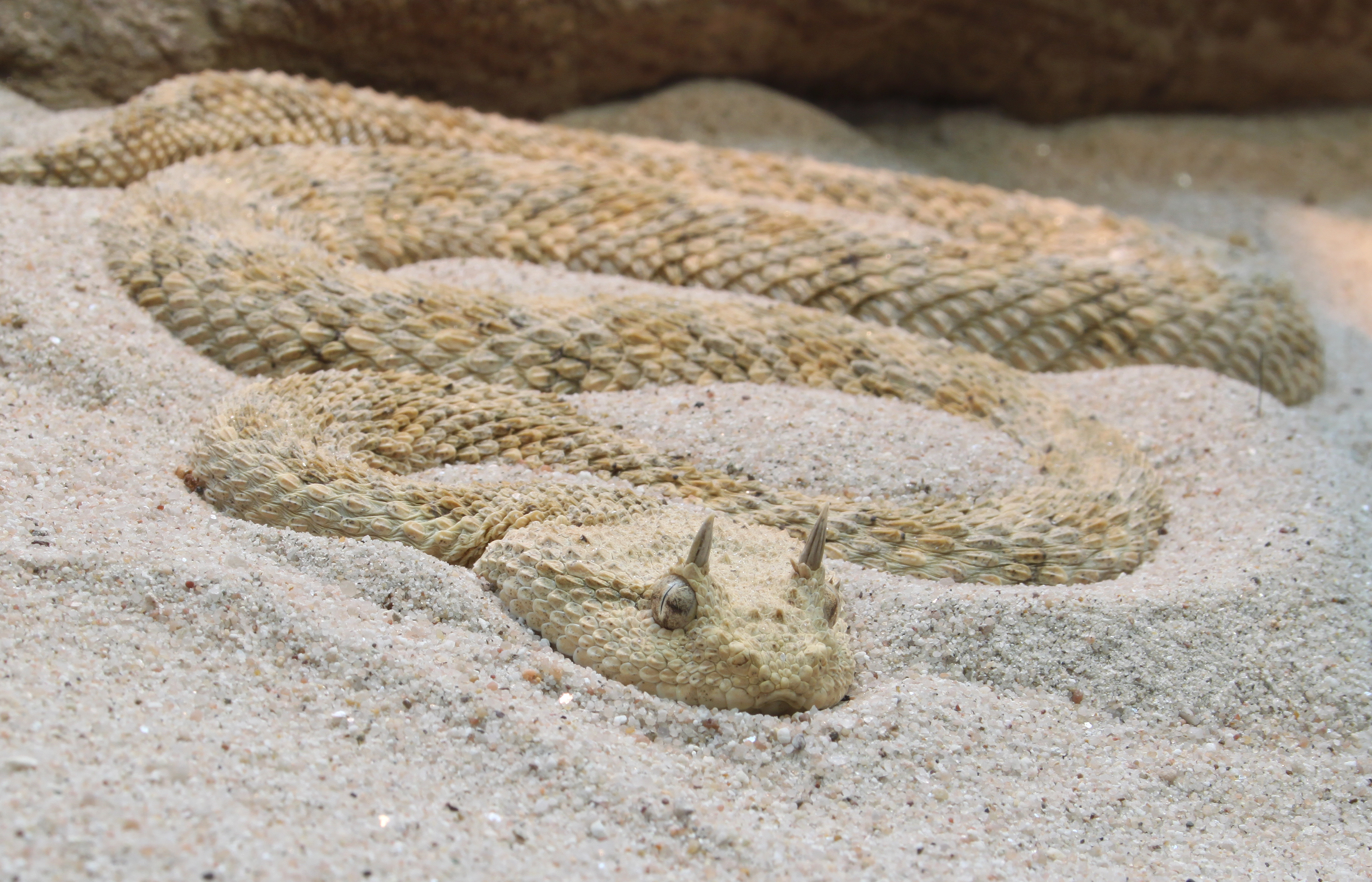
Horned desert viper (Cerastes cerastes)

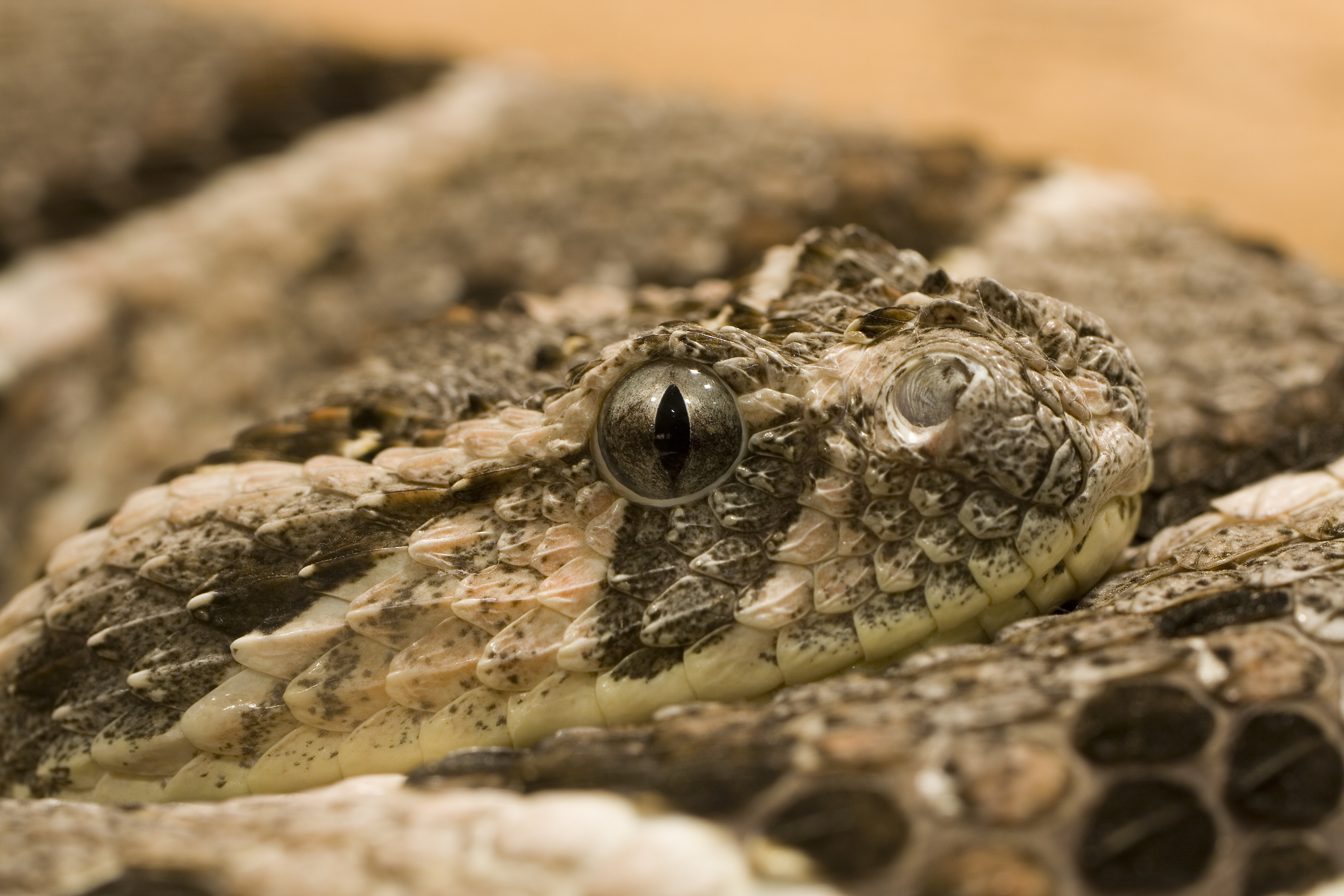
Puff adder (Bitis arietans)

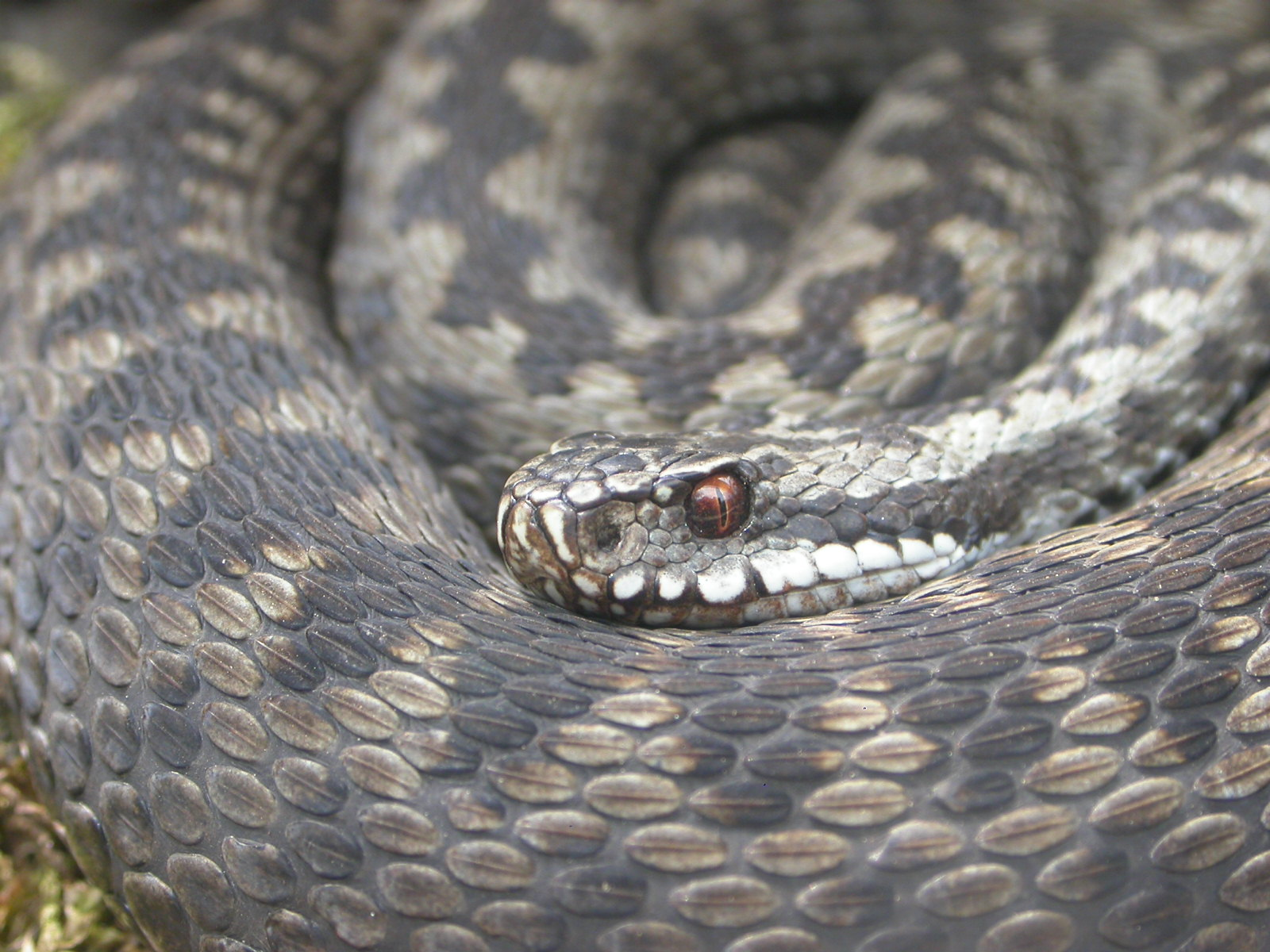
Common European adder (Vipera berus)

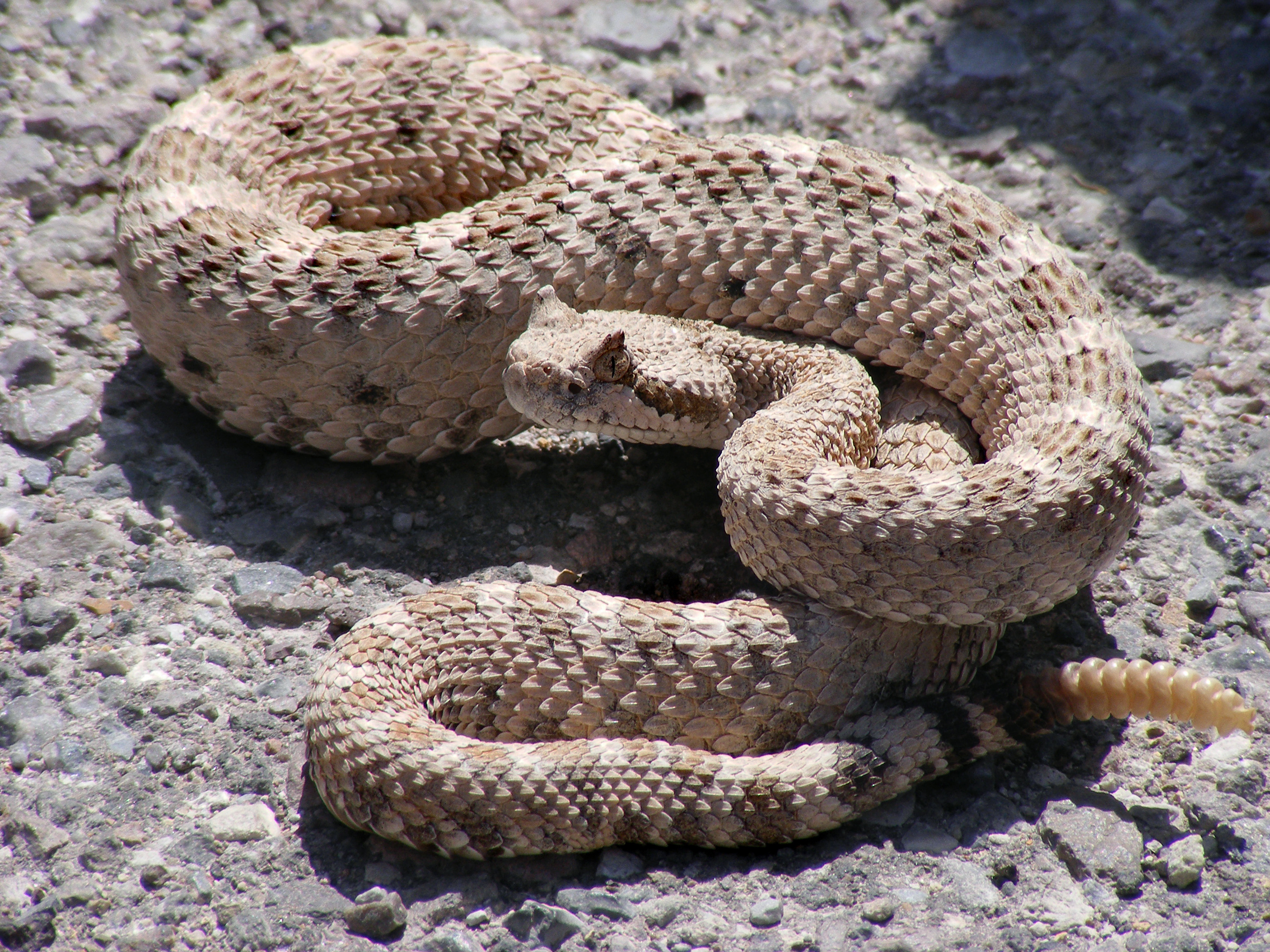
Horned rattlesnake (Crotalus cerastes)

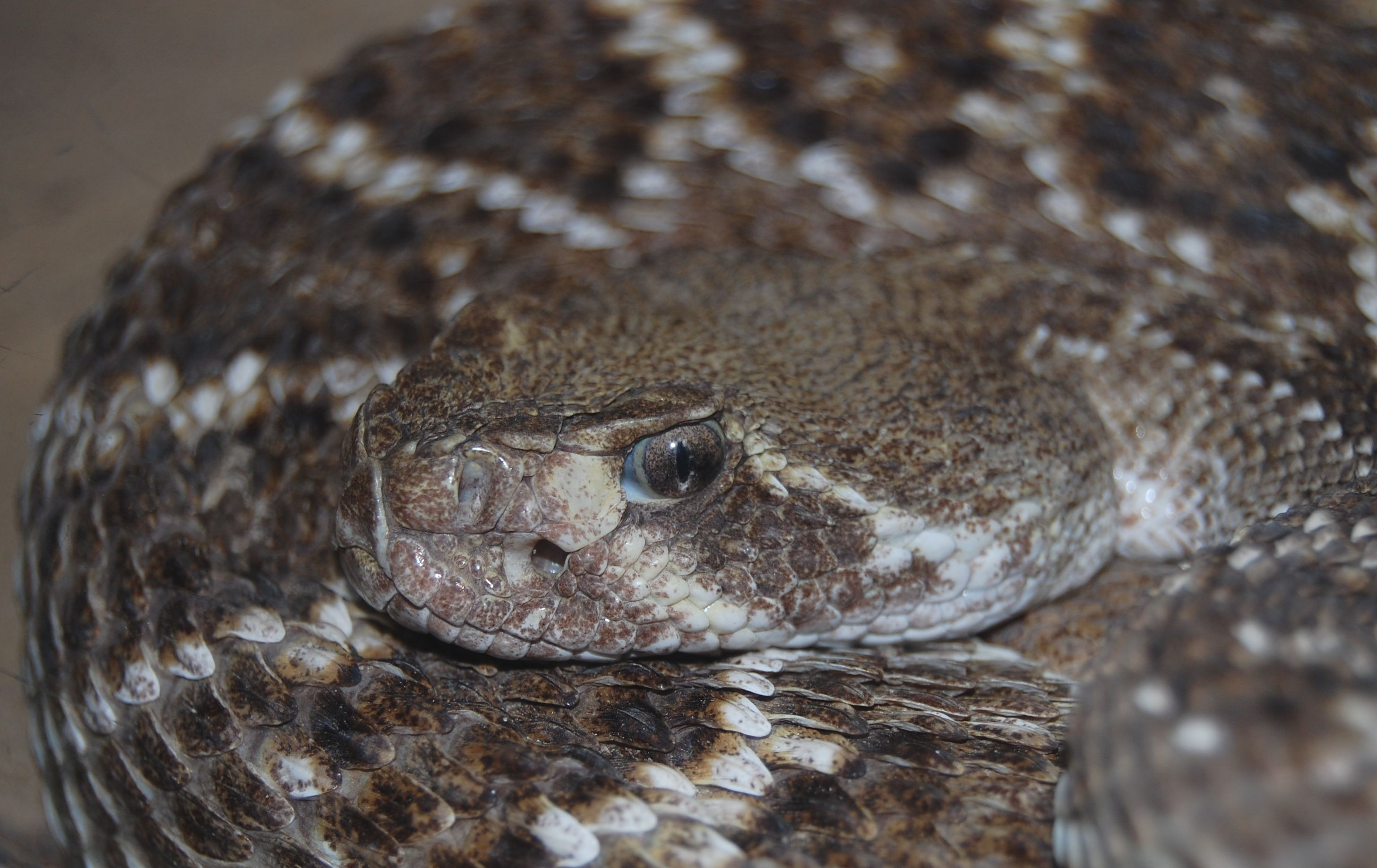
Western diamondback rattlesnake (Crotalus atrox)

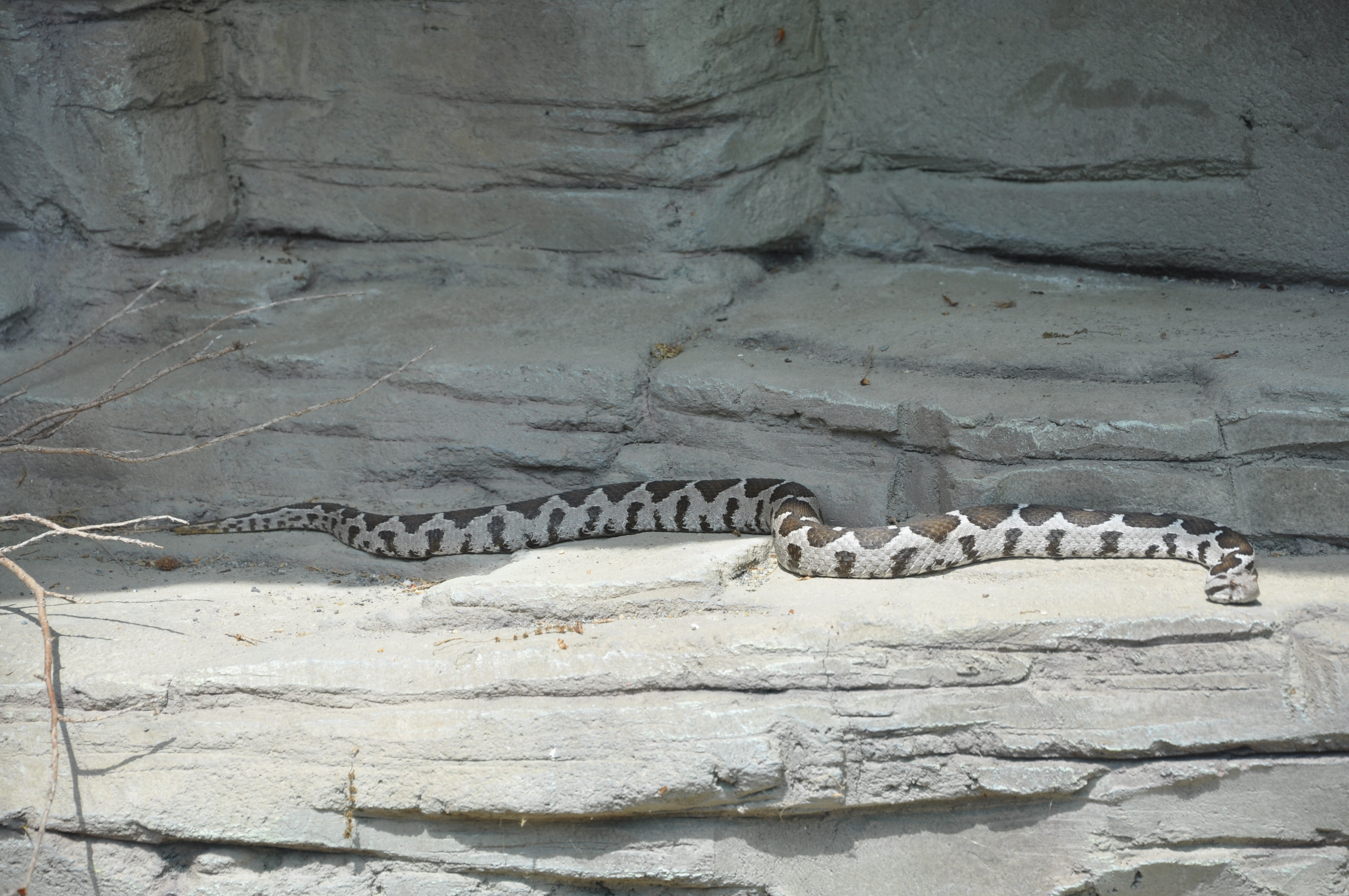
Ottoman viper shows typical non-reflective appearance of reptiles with keeled scales.

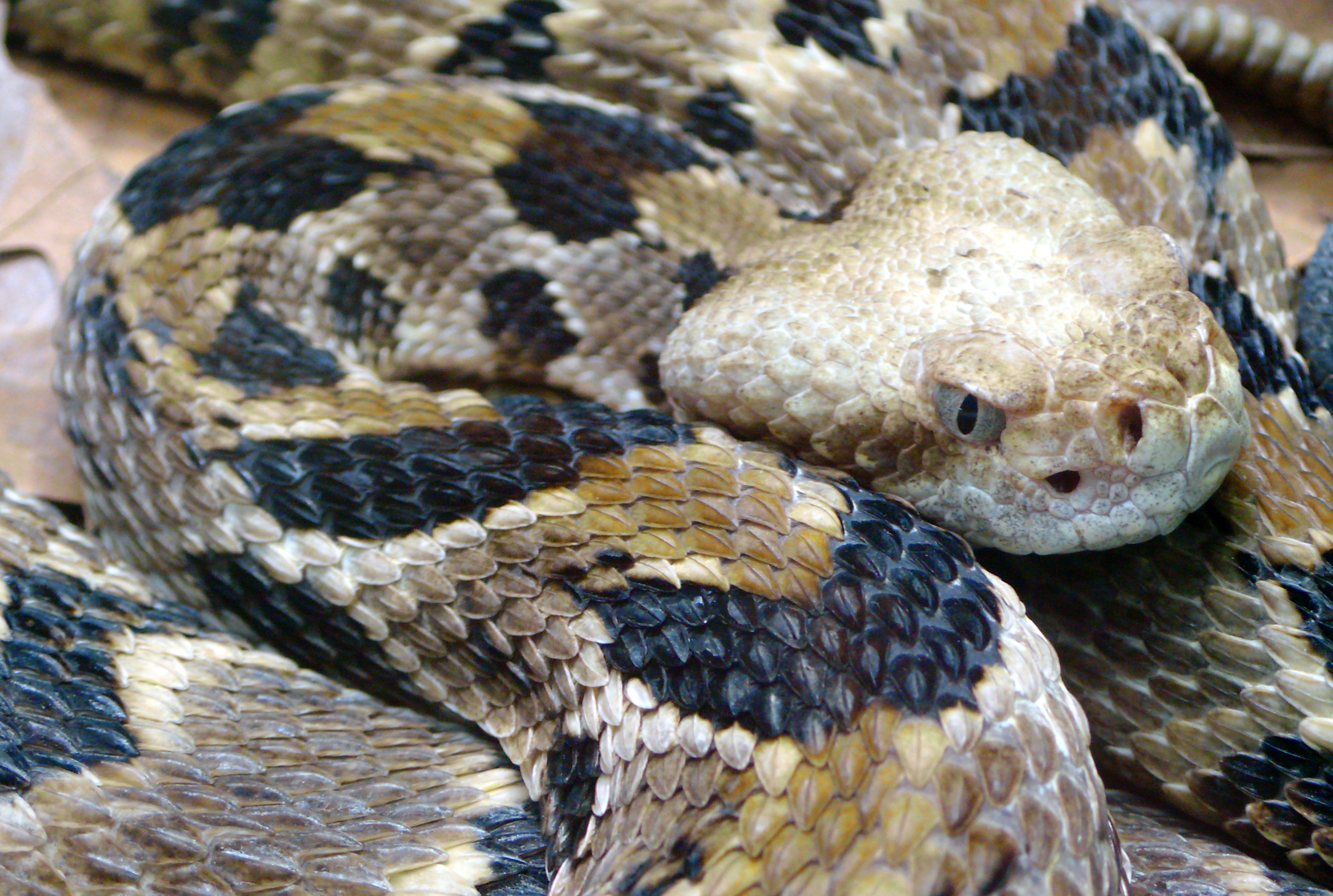
Timber rattlesnake (Crotalus horridus)

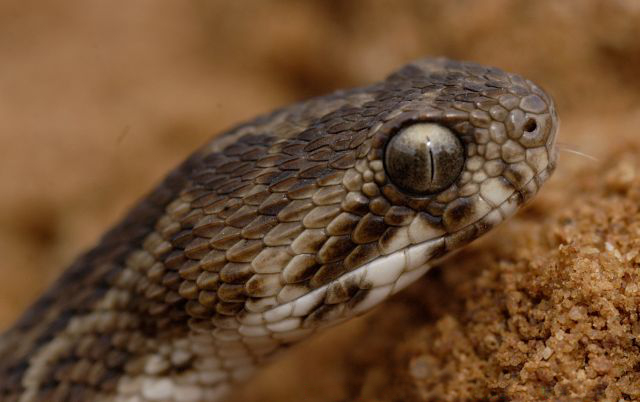
Echis carinatus

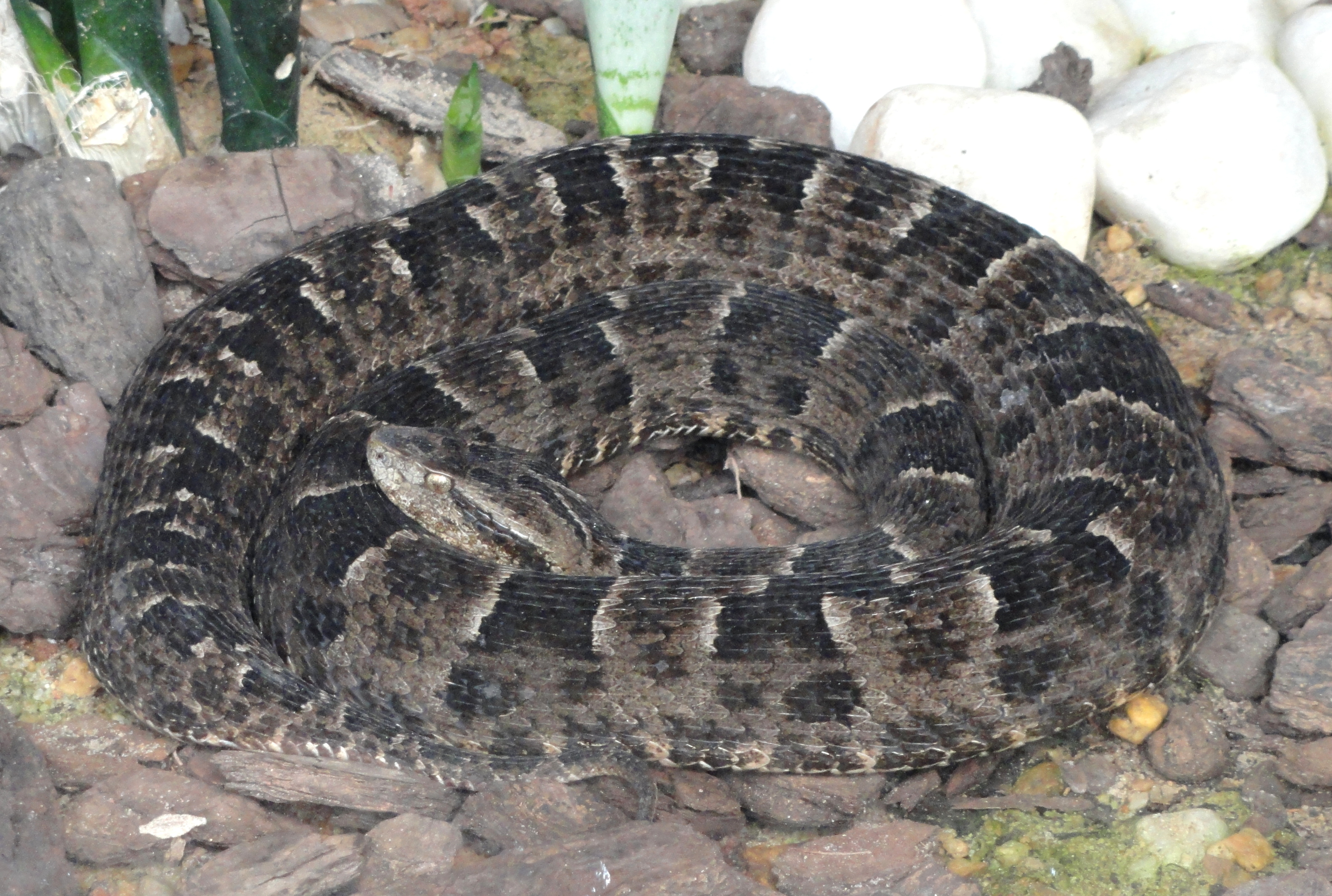
Bothrops neuwiedi (Neuwied's lancehead)

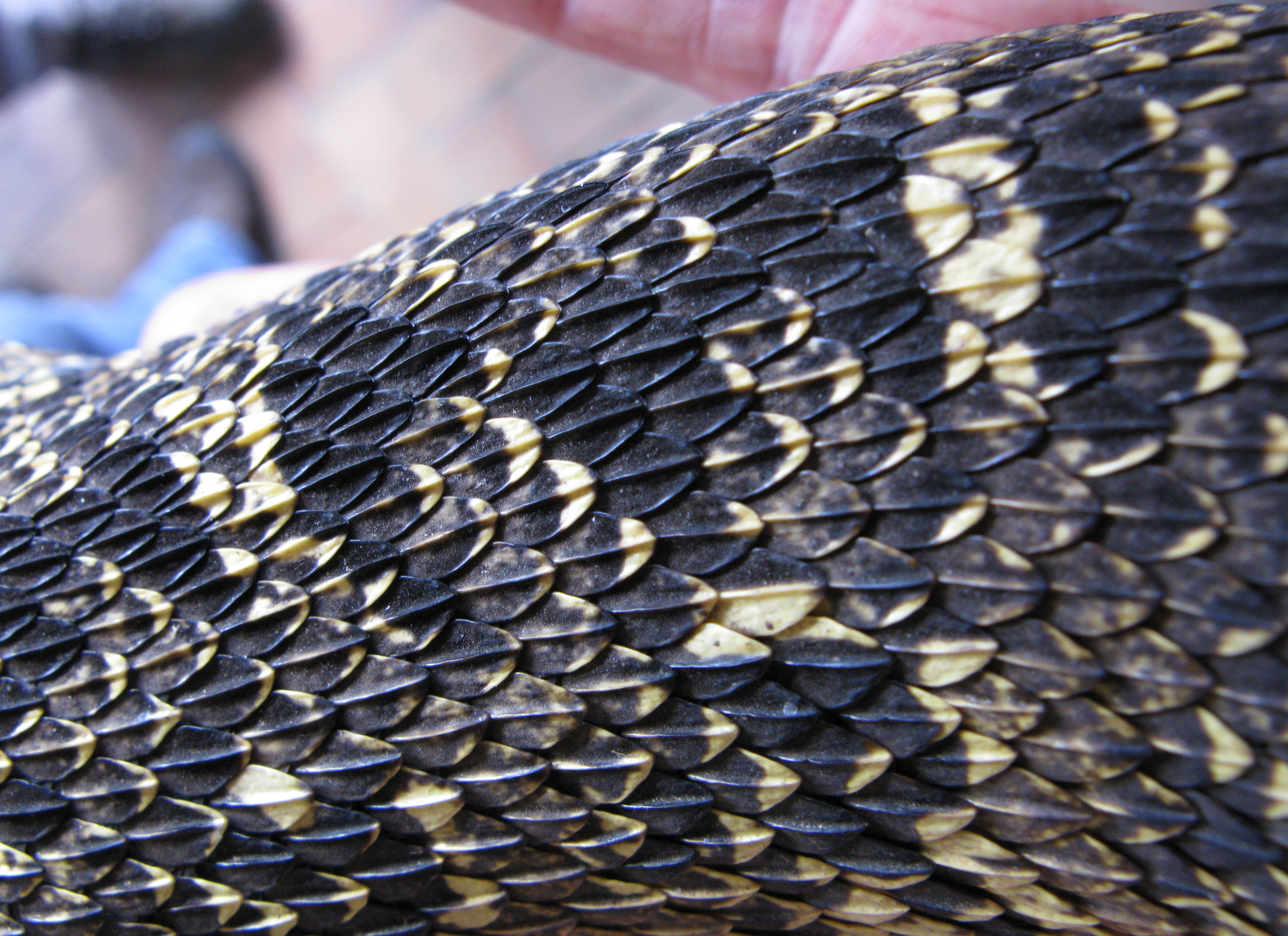
Puff adder (Bitis arietans)
