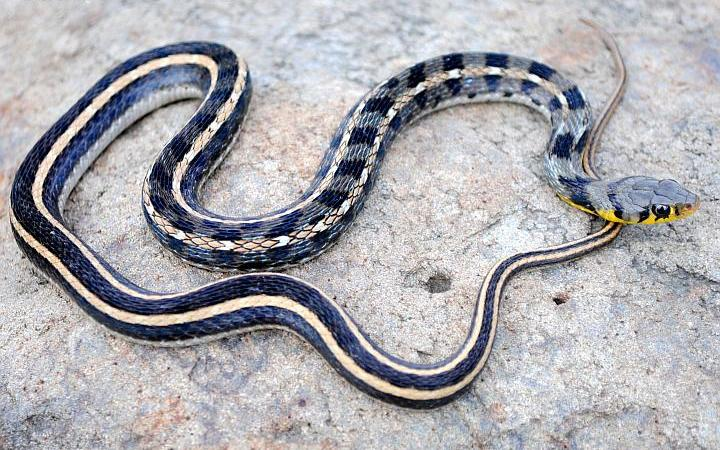
- at Yavatmal

Conservation status
- Least Concern (IUCN 3.1)

Scientific classification
- Kingdom: Animalia
- Phylum: Chordata
- Class: Reptilia
- Order: Squamata
- Suborder: Serpentes
- Family: Colubridae
- Genus: Amphiesma
- Species: A. stolatum

Binomial name
- Amphiesma stolatum (Linnaeus, 1758)

Synonyms
- Coluber stolatus Linnaeus, 1758; Elaps bilineatus Schneider, 1801; Natrix stolatus – Merrem, 1820; Tropidonotus stolatus – F. Boie, 1827; Rhabdophis stolatus – Wall, 1921; Amphiesma stolatum – David et al.

= Buff striped keelback =

Species of snake

The buff striped keelback (Amphiesma stolatum) is a species of nonvenomous colubrid snake found across Asia. It is a typically non-aggressive snake that feeds on frogs and toads. It belongs to the subfamily Natricinae, and is closely related to water snakes and grass snakes. It resembles an Asian version of the American garter snake. It is quite a common snake but is rarely seen.

== Taxonomy ==
Based on morphological characters including hemipenial morphology, dentition, and external scalation, in 1960 the genus Natrix sensu lato was divided into several genera, revalidating the genus Amphiesma with the type species A. stolatum.

== Anatomy and morphology ==
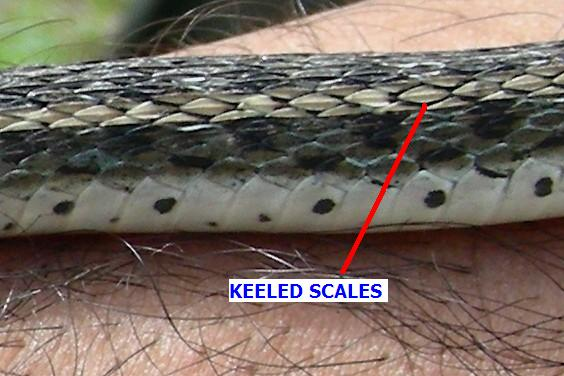
Keeled scales

A small, slender snake, the buff striped keelback is generally olive-brown to gray in colour. The head and the body are of the same colour.

The body of the buff striped keelback is short, and it has a long slender tail which is almost a quarter of its length. Two yellow stripes along the length and to the sides of the spine are the distinctive feature of this snake. These stripes are diffuse at the head and are especially bright on the second half of its body.

The keelback has irregular blackish crossbars on the body. Near the head the crossbars are prominent, whereas on the second half of the snake they become diffuse.

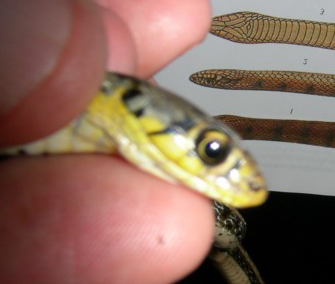
Being identified with a field guide.

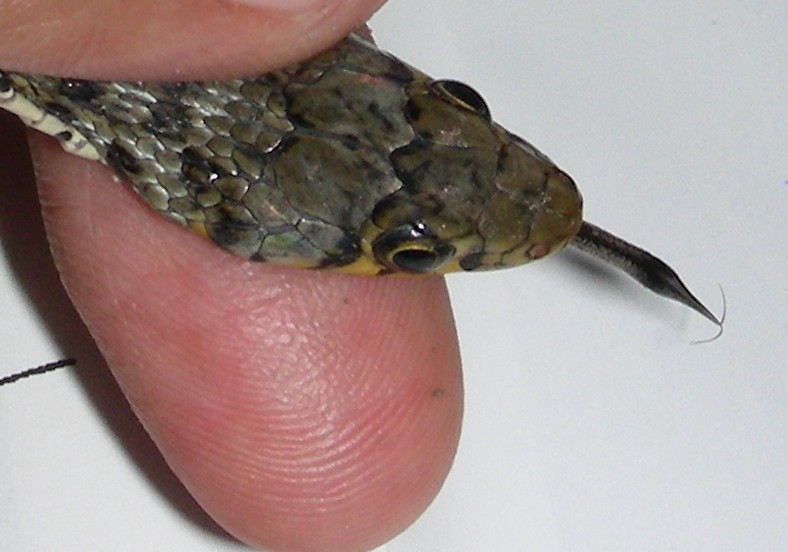
Black forked tongue.

The sides of the head are yellow, and the head tapers to form a distinctive neck. The nape is red during the breeding season. The chin and throats are white or sometimes yellow. The lips and area in front of and behind eye are yellowish. The forked tongue is black. The eyes have large round pupils with golden flecks on the iris.

The underside is pale cream and has small black spots scattered along both the margins. It has keeled scales on the dorsal surface of the body.

=== Morphs ===
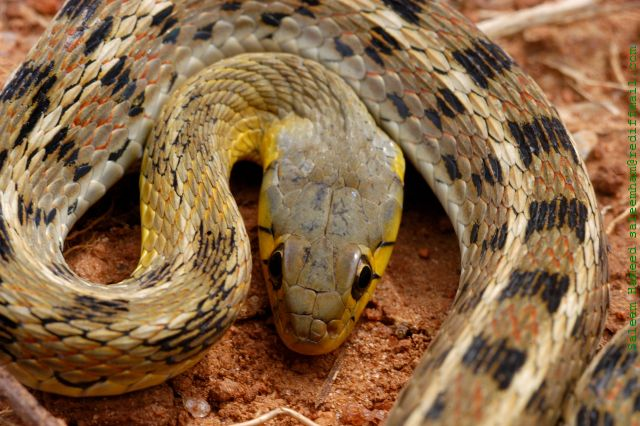
Erythrostictus form with interscale colour visible

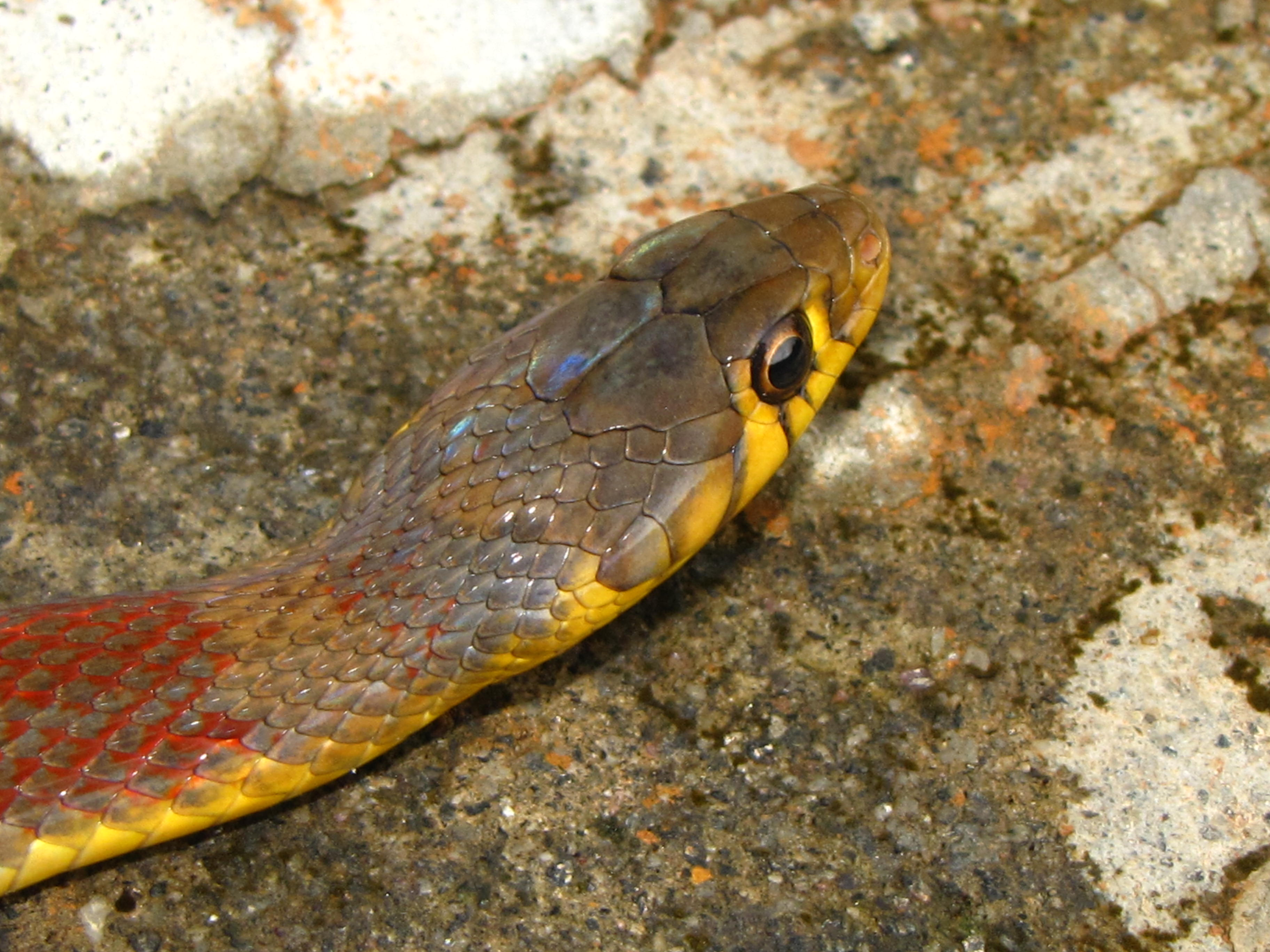
(Amphiesma stolatum) erythrostictus form, Ezhimala, Kerala, India. Note the beautiful vermillion interstices and the yellow underbelly

There are two distinct colour varieties – a typical variety, found everywhere, with grayish-blue interscale colour. The second variety, erythrostictus, is common mainly in coastal areas and has bright vermillion interscale colour. The interscale colours become visible only when the snake puffs itself up when agitated.

=== Identifying characteristics ===
Scalation has been described as:

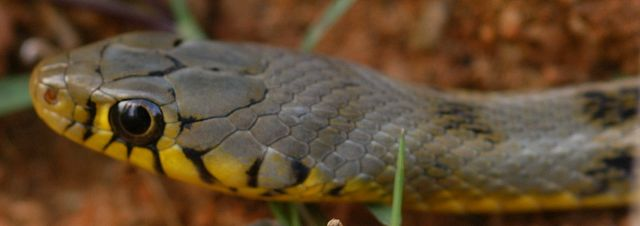
A closeup of head

1. The nasal shield does not touch the second supralabial (upper lip shield);
2. The rostral touches a total of 6 shields. These are two inter-nasals, two nasals and the first supralabial on each side;
3. Supralabial 8 (3rd to 5th touching eye);
4. Presence of single temporal shield;
5. Nineteen rows of costals which are strongly keeled except for the outer row which is perfectly smooth;
6. Presence of stripes;
7. Ventrals 118–161, usually divided;
8. Anal divided;
9. Subcaudals 46-89, paired.

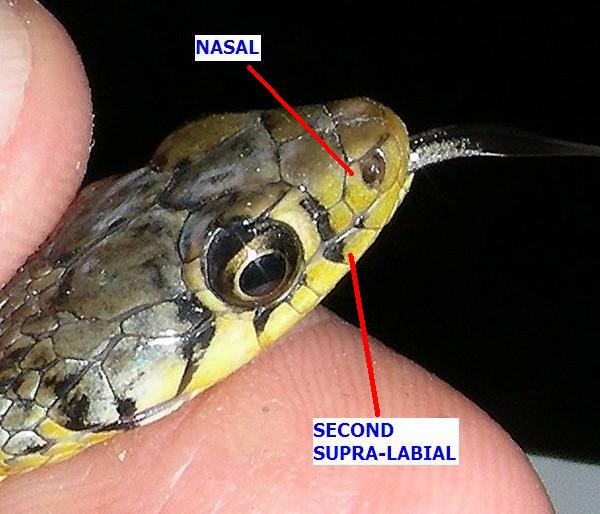
1. The nasal shield does not touch the second supralabial (upperlip shield).

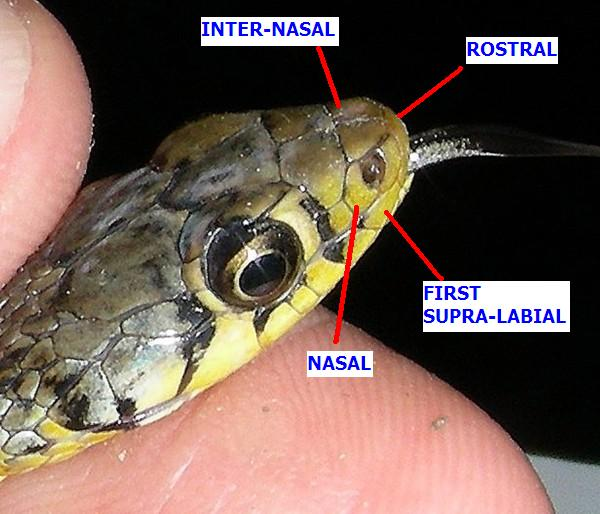
2. The rostral touches a total of 6 shields. These are two inter-nasals, two nasals and the first supralabial on each side.

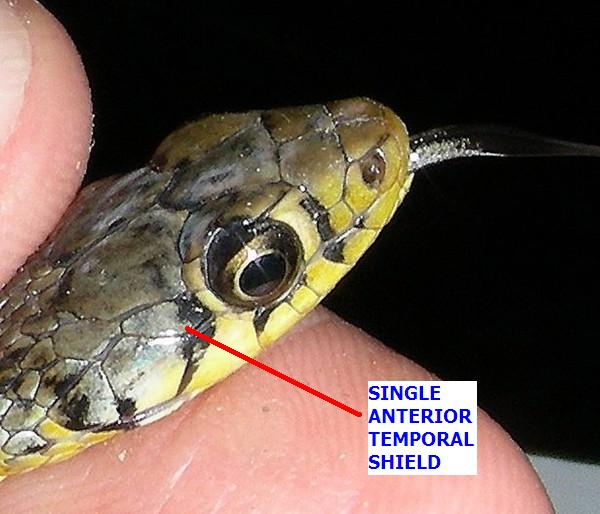
3. Presence of single temporal shield.

=== Size ===
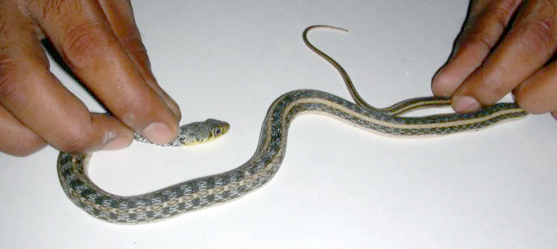
A buff striped keelback being measured. This one was 52 cm long.

The Buff Striped keelback is usually 50 to 80 cm (about 19.7 to 31.5 inches) in total length. Females are usually longer than the males.

== Distribution ==
The buff striped keelback is found throughout South and Southeast Asia. Its range extends from Pakistan (Sindh) to Sri Lanka, India (including the Andaman Islands), Bangladesh, Nepal, Myanmar, Thailand, Laos, Cambodia, Vietnam, Indonesia (Borneo, Sabah), Taiwan and China (Hainan, Hong Kong, Fujian, Jiangxi). It is also found in Bhutan.

In India, the snake is found up to an altitude of 2,000 metres (6,600 ft).

== Conservation status ==
The buff striped keelback is common throughout its range, and is not of international conservation concern.

== Ecology and life history ==
=== Habitat ===
This terrestrial, diurnal snake inhabits well-watered lowland plains and hills.

=== Feeding ecology ===
The primary diet of adult A. stolatum is small amphibians such as frogs and toads, but they are also known to consume earthworms, small lizards and rodents.

=== Life history ===
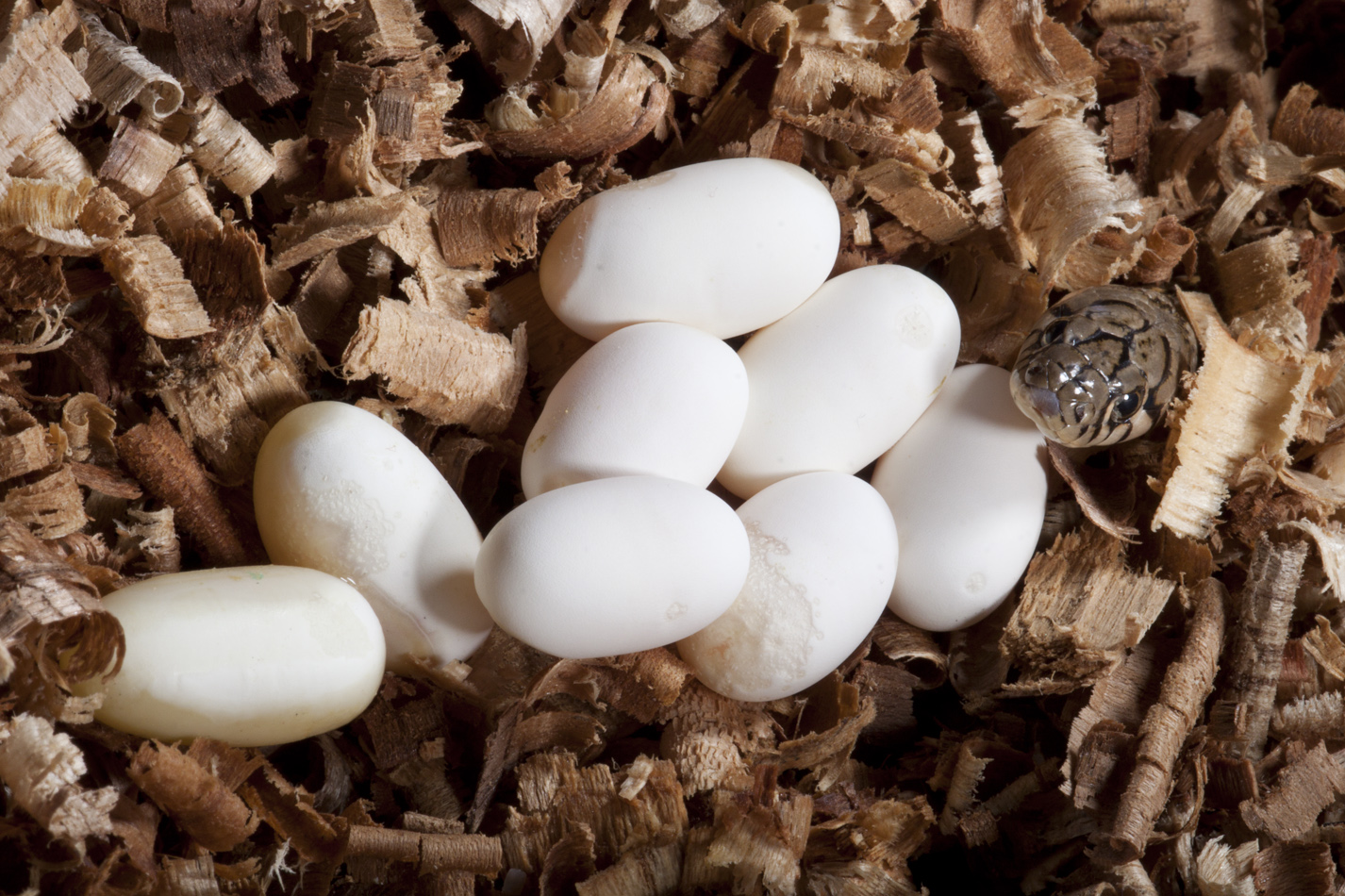
Rescued egg clutch

Keelbacks are oviparous. Mating is thought to take place during the aestivation period. Gravid females have been found from April to August and eggs are laid in underground holes from May to September. The snake lays a clutch of 5 to 15 pure white eggs. Females remain with eggs till they hatch. The young snakes are 9-14 cm at birth and eat insects, tadpoles, small toads and frogs.

== Behavior ==
The buff striped keelback is diurnal, and although mostly seen on land, it can readily take to water.

The buff striped keelback is nonvenomous and totally harmless. When alarmed, it inflates its body causing the bright interscale colours to be exposed. Sometimes, the snake flattens and narrows its head to form a hood. This behaviour sometimes causes the species to be mistaken by laypersons for a baby cobra.

The snake aestivates during hot weather and appears at the end of summer. It is abundant during the rains. In north India, the striped keelback hibernates 25 to 45 cm (about 10 to 18 inches) under the ground in soil, amongst grass roots.

== Gallery ==
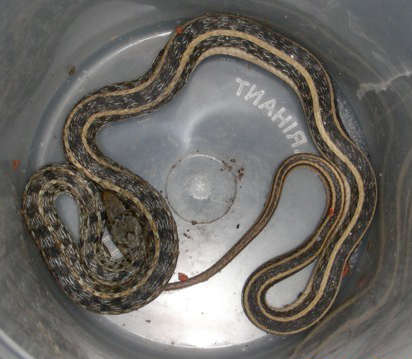
A buff-striped keelback (normal form)

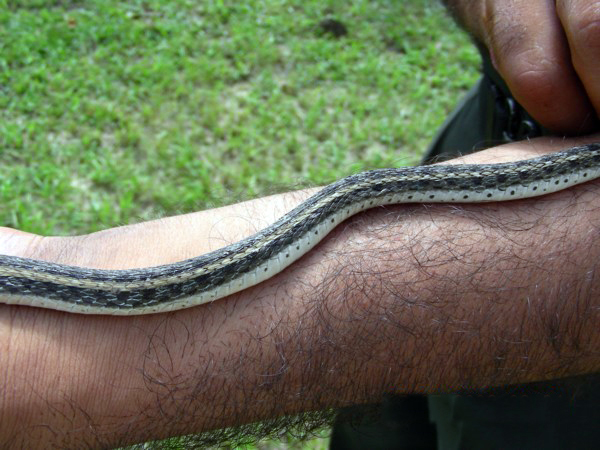
The body of the snake

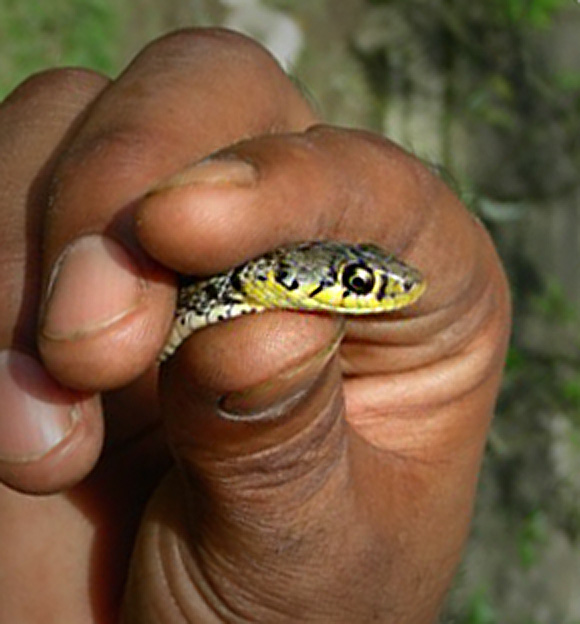
The snake being held by the head

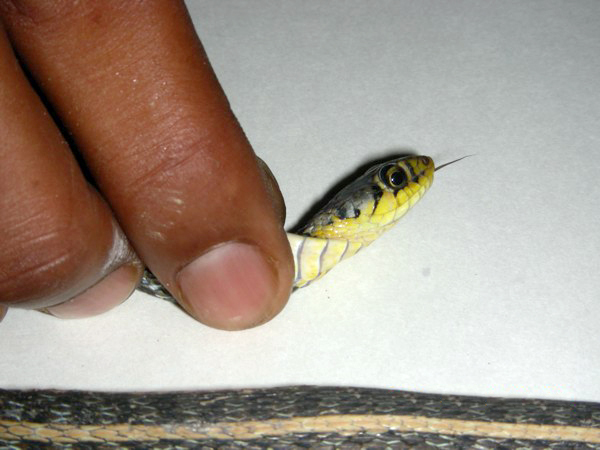
The snake twisting its head while being held.

== Bibliography ==
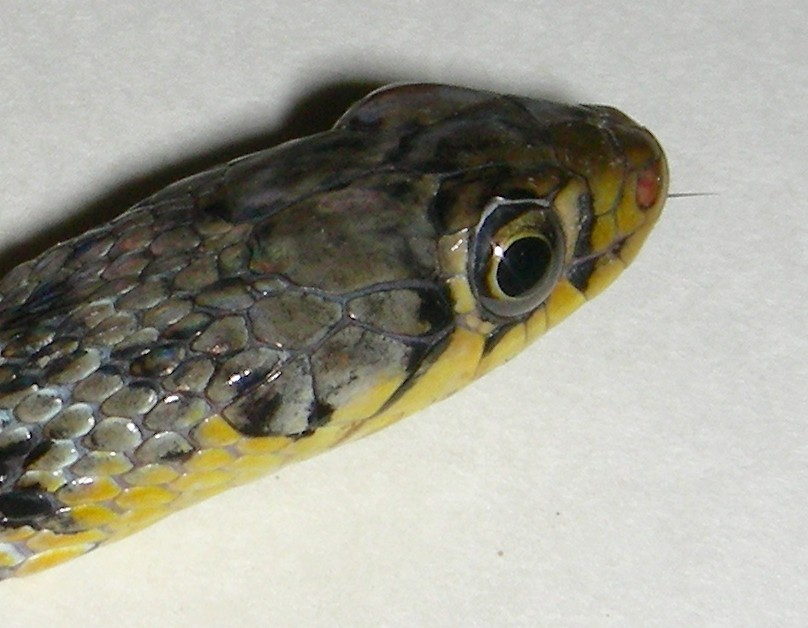
Closeup of head

- Boulenger, George A. 1890. The Fauna of British India, Including Ceylon and Burma. Reptilia and Batrachia. Secretary of State for India in Council. (Taylor and Francis, Printers). London. xviii + 541 pp. (Tropidonotus stolatus, pp. 348–349.)
- Boulenger, G.A. 1893. Catalogue of the Snakes in the British Museum (Natural History). Volume I., Containing the Families...Colubridæ Aglyphæ, Part. Trustees of the British Museum (Natural History). (Taylor and Francis, Printers). London. xiii + 448 pp. + Plates I.-XXVIII. (Tropidonotus stolatus, pp. 253–254.)
- Cox, Merel J.; Van Dijk, Peter Paul; Jarujin Nabhitabhata & Thirakhupt, Kumthorn. 1998. A Photographic Guide to Snakes and Other Reptiles of Peninsular Malaysia, Singapore and Thailand. Ralph Curtis Publishing. Sanibel Island, Florida. 144 pp.
- Daniels, J.C. 2002. Book of Indian Reptiles and Amphibians. BNHS. Oxford University Press. Mumbai.
- Das, I. 1999. Biogeography of the amphibians and reptiles of the Andaman and Nicobar Islands, India. In: Ota, H. (ed) Tropical Island herpetofauna. Elsevier, pp. 43–77.
- Das, I. 2002. A Photographic Guide to Snakes and Other Reptiles of India. Ralph Curtis Books. Sanibel Island, Florida. 144 pp. ISBN 0-88359-056-5. (Amphiesma stolatum, p. 19.)
- Linnaeus, C. 1758. Systema Naturae. 10th Edition: 204 pp.
- Wall, Frank. 1921. Ophidia Taprobanica or the Snakes of Ceylon. Colombo Museum. (H.R. Cottle, government printer). Colombo. xxii + 581 pp.
