= A. intermedius =

A. intermedius may refer to:

- Abacetus intermedius, a ground beetle
- Acanthogyrus intermedius, a parasitic worm found in Africa
- Acinonyx intermedius, a prehistoric cheetah
- Actinomyces intermedius, a synonym of Streptomyces intermedius, a bacterium
- Adenanthos intermedius, a synonym of Adenanthos barbiger, a plant found in Australia
- Agaricus intermedius, a synonym of Lactarius torminosus, a fungus
- Agkistrodon intermedius, a synonym of Gloydius intermedius, the Central Asian pit viper
- Amblyseius intermedius, a mite
- Ancistrodon intermedius, a synonym of two pit vipers: Gloydius intermedius and Gloydius saxatilis
- Andropogon intermedius, a synonym of Bothriochloa bladhii, a grass found in Africa, Asia, and Australia
- Anochetus intermedius, a prehistoric ant
- Aphthalmichthys intermedius, a synonym of Moringua ferruginea, the rusty spaghetti eel, found in the Indo-Pacific region
- Archimedes intermedius, a bryozoan
- Arion intermedius, a land slug native to Europe
- Artibeus intermedius, a synonym of Artibeus lituratus, the great fruit-eating bat, found in the Americas
- Aspergillus intermedius, a fungus
- Asprocottus intermedius, a freshwater fish found in Russia
- Australentulus intermedius, a proturan found in Australia
