= Gloydius cognatus =

Scientific classification
- Kingdom: Animalia
- Phylum: Chordata
- Order: Squamata
- Suborder: Serpentes
- Family: Viperidae
- Genus: Gloydius
- Species: G. cognatus

Binomial name
- Gloydius cognatus Gloyd, 1977

Species of Asian snake

Gloydius cognatus, or the Alashan pitviper, is a species of Asian moccasin from North West China and Mongolia. As with all pit vipers it is venomous, and it is considered the most toxic species of Gloydius in China.

== Description ==
Considered a small viper, growing to 59 cm, the Alashan pitviper is distinguished from similar species by its specific scale counts as well as its banded pattern including 29-43 dark bands.

== Habitat ==
The Alashan pitviper has been known to in habit desert or desertification grassland at elevations above 1300 m to above 3000 m, preferring temperate, rock/gravel areas with low rainfall.

== Reproduction ==
Gloydius cognatus is known to be viviparous.

== Taxonomy ==
Glydius cognatus has previously been considered a subspecies of G. halys, and a synonym of G. brevicaudus and either G. strauchi or G. intermedius. It is now elevated to its own separate species, and is theorised to have split from G. halys and G. intermedius during the pleistocene.

While multiple distinct clades of G. cognatus have been recognised as of 2023, no subspecies are currently recognised.
