= Gloydius huangi =

Scientific classification
- Kingdom: Animalia
- Phylum: Chordata
- Class: Reptilia
- Order: Squamata
- Suborder: Serpentes
- Family: Viperidae
- Genus: Gloydius
- Species: G. huangi

Binomial name
- Gloydius huangi Wang et al., 2019

Species of Tibetan snake

Gloydius huangi, the Lancang Plateau viper, is a species of Asian moccasin from Tibet. Taxonomically it is named after Dr. Song Huang, a herpetologist from Huangshan University, and the suggested common name is after the name of the river basin it is found in, in hopes of promoting its conservation. As with all pit vipers, it is venomous. It is most closely related to G. monticola.

== Description ==
The Lancang Plateau viper is a medium-sized snake (up to 53.2 cm) with an oval/spoon-shaped head and a blunt snout. Its scales are matte rather than glossy or metallic and it is beige to peachy in base colouration with many grey or black patches – one is a distinct c-shape patch on the head. It also displays a unique hemipenis morphology with long spines.

Compared to the species it was previously describes as, Gloydius strauchi, the Lancang Plateau viper can be distinguished by its larger size and its distinct pattern.

== Habitat ==
The species prefers hot, dry areas at an elevation of around 3,000 to 3,300 m. They will often shelter in rock crevices when in the presence of a human. According to locals, this species is common.

== Diet ==
It is theorised that the Lancang Plateau viper is a predator of Diploderma vela, as they are codistributed.
