= Ancistrodon halys intermedius =

Ancistrodon halys intermedius is a taxonomic synonym that may refer to:

- Gloydius saxatilis, a.k.a. the Amur viper, a venomous pitviper found in Russia, China and the Korean Peninsula
- Gloydius intermedius, a.k.a. the Central Asian pitviper, a venomous pitviper found in northern Asia
- Gloydius ussuriensis, a.k.a. the Ussuri mamushi, a venomous pitviper found in far east Russia, northeastern China and the Korean Peninsula
