= Gloydius changdaoensis =

Scientific classification
- Kingdom: Animalia
- Phylum: Chordata
- Order: Squamata
- Suborder: Serpentes
- Family: Viperidae
- Genus: Gloydius
- Species: G. changdaoensis

Binomial name
- Gloydius changdaoensis Li, 1999

Endangered species of Chinese snake

Gloydius changdaoensis is a species of Asian moccasin from Shandong Province, China. The name changdaoensis comes from the area it was first discovered in, Changdao County. As with all pit vipers, it is venomous. It has been named (as G. lijianlii) as one of the 30 most endangered viper species in 2016.

== Taxonomy ==
It has been suggested to be synonymised with G. lijianlii by Simonov et al. in 2017 and Asadi et al. in 2019, but there has been no further support, so the validity of them as separate species is currently uncertain.

Previously considered a subspecies of G. intermedius or G. saxatilis, it has now been suggested as a full species due to its molecular distance from G. intermedius.
