= Gloydius lateralis =

Scientific classification
- Kingdom: Animalia
- Phylum: Chordata
- Class: Reptilia
- Order: Squamata
- Suborder: Serpentes
- Family: Viperidae
- Genus: Gloydius
- Species: G. lateralis

Binomial name
- Gloydius lateralis (Zhang, Shi, Li, Yan, Wang, Ding, Du, Plenković-Moraj, Jiang, Shi, 2022)

Species of snake

Gloydius lateralis is a species of venomous pit viper found in the Zharu Valley of Jiuzhaigou County, China. The species is active during sunny days in hot and dry areas along roadsides. The Zharu Valley is the sole known location of G. lateralis. This snake is assumed to eat small mammals like mice, based on the fur remnants found within its droppings. This species lineage is a sister taxon to G. swild, being morphologically and phylogenetically similar.

The species has a small body, large eyes (relative to the head), bilateral pits, and divided subcaudal scales. The species also has 20 to 21 rows of mid-body dorsal scales. The dorsal body is greenish to light brown and with 4 rows of zigzag dark brown patches. A continuous, regular grey-brown ventrolateral stripe runs down on each side of the body and tail. The scientific name "lateralis" comes from this greyish-brown stripe G. lateralis has.
