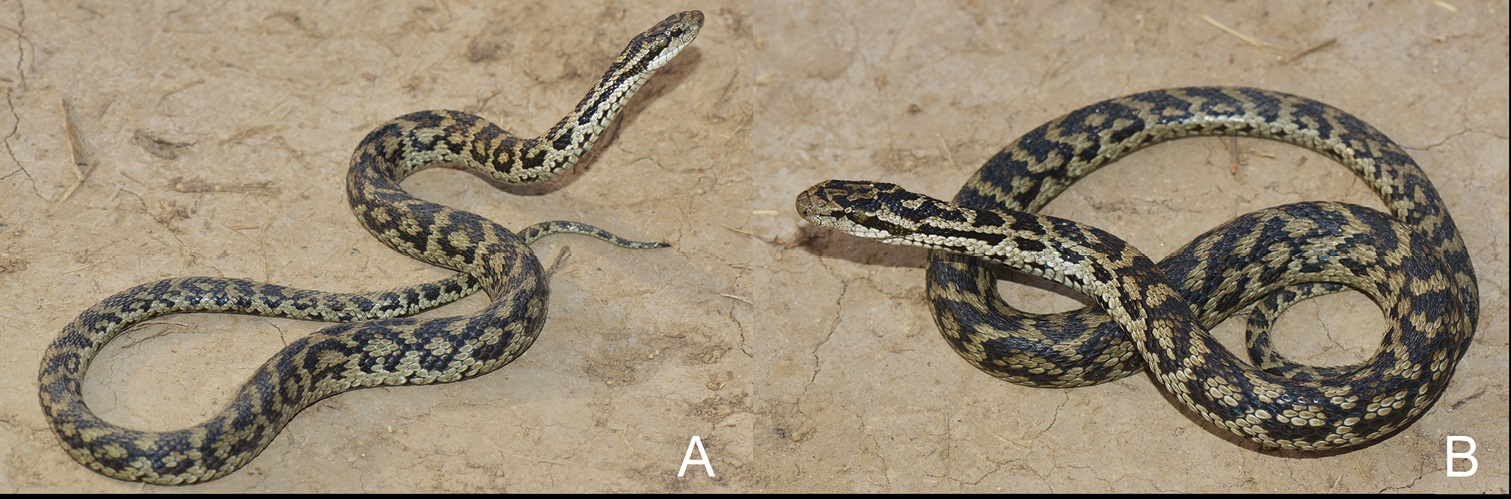

Scientific classification
- Domain: Eukaryota
- Kingdom: Animalia
- Phylum: Chordata
- Class: Reptilia
- Order: Squamata
- Suborder: Serpentes
- Family: Viperidae
- Genus: Gloydius
- Species: G. lipipengi

Binomial name
- Gloydius lipipengi Shi et al., 2021

= Gloydius lipipengi =

Species of Chinese snake

Gloydius lipipengi, the Nujiang pit viper, is a species of Asian moccasin from China. Taxonomically it is named after Prof. Pi-Peng Li, a herpetologist from Shenyang Normal University. As with all pit vipers, it is venomous. It is most closely related to G. rubromaculatus.

== Description ==
A small snake, the Nujiang pit viper is distinguishable by its grey-black markings and specific scale counts and morphologies. The markings are a pair on the front of the snake's triangular head, horizontal stripes from the eyes to the cheeks to the neck, and irregular shapes along the body.

== Habitat ==
Gloydius lipipengi is known to reside in hot, dry areas of leaf litter in forests.

== Diet ==
The Nuijang pit viper has been known to eat pink mice in captivity.
