= Gloydius chambensis =

Scientific classification
- Kingdom: Animalia
- Phylum: Chordata
- Class: Reptilia
- Order: Squamata
- Suborder: Serpentes
- Family: Viperidae
- Genus: Gloydius
- Species: G. chambensis

Binomial name
- Gloydius chambensis Kuttalam, Santra, Owens, Selvan, Mukherjee, Graham, Togridou, Bharti, Shi, Shanker & Malhotra, 2022

Species of snake

Gloydius chambensis, the Chamba pitviper, is a species of venomous snake belonging to the family Viperidae and the subfamily Crotalinae, the pit vipers. It was described in 2022 from the Chamba District of Himachal Pradesh in the southern Himalayas of northern India. It was identified as a separate species from Gloydius himalayanus by genetic differences and by differences in the counts of scales in some tracts.
