= Gloydius qinlingensis =

Scientific classification
- Kingdom: Animalia
- Phylum: Chordata
- Class: Reptilia
- Order: Squamata
- Suborder: Serpentes
- Family: Viperidae
- Genus: Gloydius
- Species: G. qinlingensis

Binomial name
- Gloydius qinlingensis Song and Chen, 1985

Species of Chinese snake

Gloydius qinlingenis is a species of Asian moccasin from Shaanxi, China, named after Mt. Qin Ling where it was originally found. As with all pit vipers, it is venomous. The taxonomic status of this species is controversial, with some reports suggesting it should be recognised as a valid species and others suggesting it is a synonym of G. strauchi, which it was previously considered a subspecies of. Currently, G. qinlingensis is considered a full species due to its genetic distance from the other members of Gloydius.

== Description ==
Gloydius qinlingensis can be distinguished by a few features including its specific scale counts as well as its oval or triangular head and light red/yellow -brown colouring with its dark brown irregular markings.

== Reproduction ==
Gloydius qinlingensis is known to be ovoviviparous.
