= Gloydius liupanensis =

Scientific classification
- Kingdom: Animalia
- Phylum: Chordata
- Class: Reptilia
- Order: Squamata
- Suborder: Serpentes
- Family: Viperidae
- Genus: Gloydius
- Species: G. liupanensis

Binomial name
- Gloydius liupanensis Liu et al., 1989

Species of Chinese snake

Gloydius liupanensis is a species of Asian moccasin from China, named after the Liupan Mountains where it was originally found. As with all pit vipers, it is venomous. The validity of the species is debated, but recent studies declare it as a valid species.

== Description ==
Gloydius liupanensis can be distinguished by its long white stripe markings, head to tail on the sides. Its head is triangular and it displays a light red brown or yellow brown colouration.

== Reproduction ==
Gloydius liupanensis is known to be viviparous.
