= Mongolian pit viper =

Mongolian pit viper may refer to:

- Gloydius halys, also known as the Siberian pit viper, a venomous pitviper species found in Russia and China.
- Gloydius intermedius, also known as the Central Asian pitviper, a venomous pitviper species found in northern Asia.
