= Spotted rattlesnake =

Spotted rattlesnake may refer to:

- Sistrurus miliarius, a.k.a. the pygmy rattlesnake, a venomous pitviper species found in the southeastern United States
- Crotalus pricei, a.k.a. the twin-spotted rattlesnake, a venomous pitviper species found in the United States and Mexico
- Crotalus viridis, a.k.a. the prairie rattlesnake, a venomous pitviper species native to the western United States, southwestern Canada, and northern Mexico
