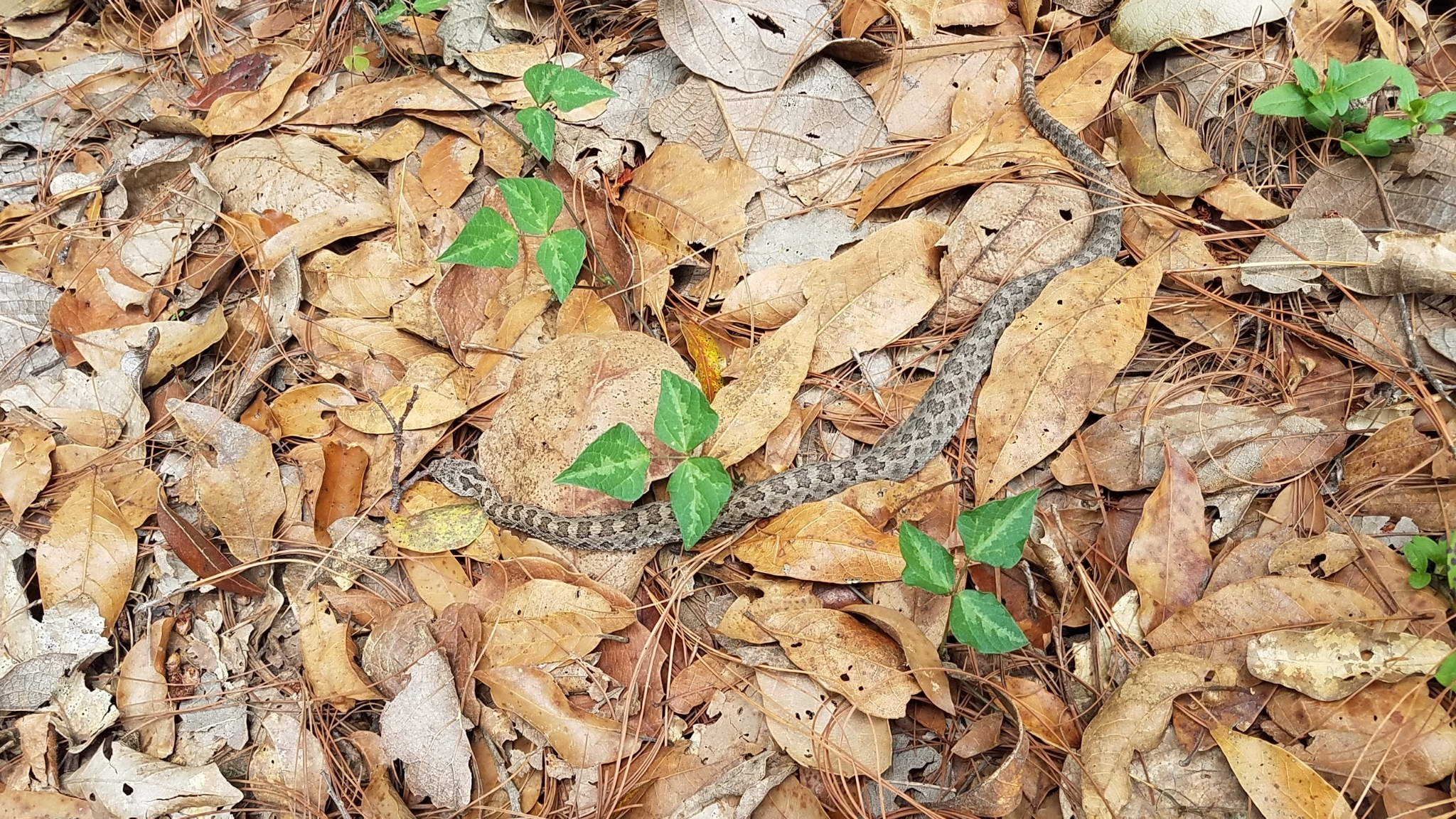

Scientific classification
- Kingdom: Animalia
- Phylum: Chordata
- Class: Reptilia
- Order: Squamata
- Suborder: Serpentes
- Family: Viperidae
- Genus: Crotalus
- Species: C. intermedius
- Subspecies: C. i. gloydi

Trinomial name
- Crotalus intermedius gloydi Taylor, 1941

Synonyms
- Crotalus triseriatus gloydi Taylor, 1941; Crotalus gloydi lautus H.M. Smith in H.M. Smith & Laufe, 1945; Crotalus gloydi — H.M. Smith & Taylor, 1945; Crotalus gloydi lautus — H.M. Smith, 1946; Crotalus gloydi gloydi — H.M. Smith, 1946; Crotalus intermedius gloydi — W.B. Davis & Dixon, 1957

= Crotalus intermedius gloydi =

Subspecies of snake

Common names: Oaxacan small-headed rattlesnake.

Crotalus intermedius gloydi is a subspecies of venomous pitviper in the family Viperidae. The subspecies is endemic to Mexico in the states of Oaxaca and Puebla.

== Etymology ==
The subspecific name, gloydi, is in honor of American herpetologist Howard K. Gloyd.

== Description ==
This subspecies, Crotalus intermedius gloydi, can be identified by its scalation. It is characterized by having the postnasal scale in broad contact with the first supralabial scale. Also, the postnasal is usually not in contact with any other supralabial scale.

== Geographic range ==
Crotalus intermedius gloydi is found in Mexico, in south, central and northern Oaxaca, as well as in central Puebla.

The type locality given is "Cerro San Felipe (elevation 10,000 ft. [= 3,048 m]) near [15 km northwest of] Oaxaca, Oaxaca, Mexico".
