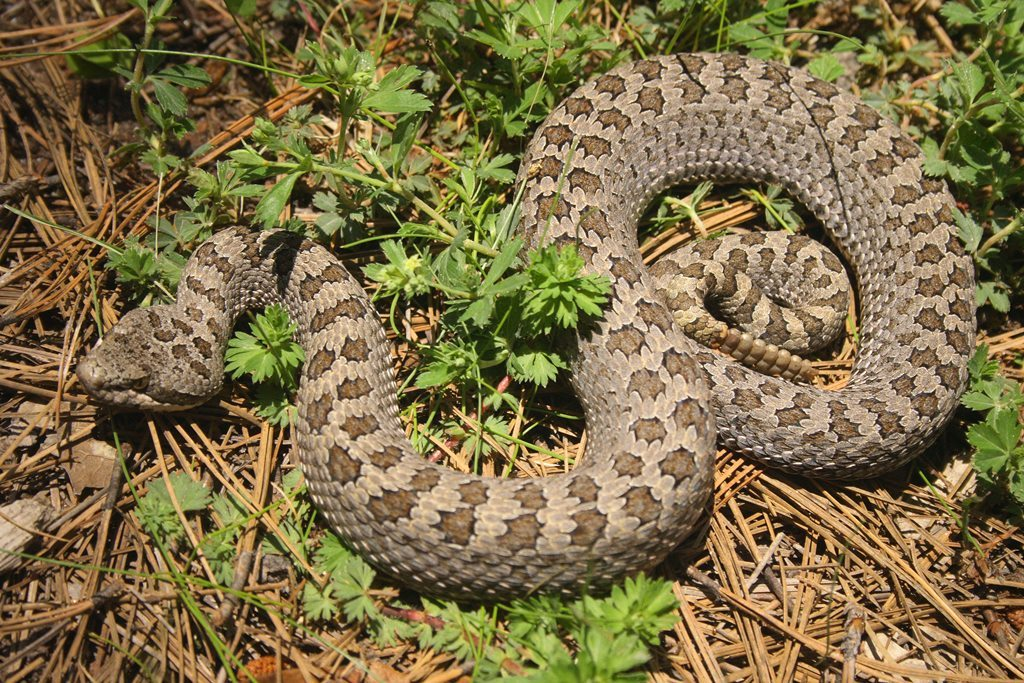

Conservation status
- Least Concern (IUCN 3.1)

Scientific classification
- Kingdom: Animalia
- Phylum: Chordata
- Class: Reptilia
- Order: Squamata
- Suborder: Serpentes
- Family: Viperidae
- Genus: Crotalus
- Species: C. pricei

Binomial name
- Crotalus pricei Van Denburgh, 1895
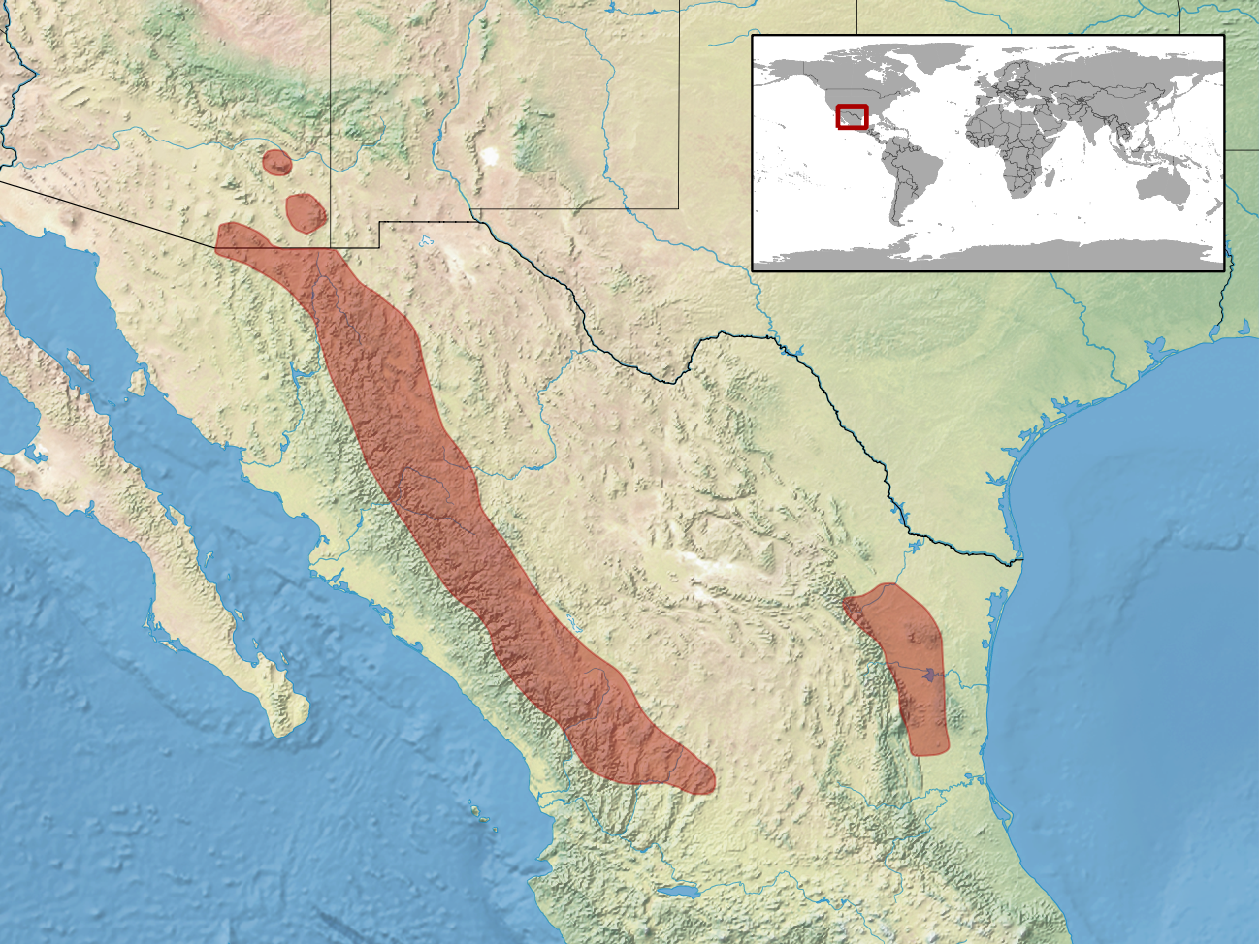

Synonyms
- Crotalus pricei Van Denburgh, 1895; C [rotalus]. t [riseriatus]. pricei — Klauber In Githens & George, 1931; Crotalus pricei pricei — H.M. Smith, 1946

= Crotalus pricei =

Species of snake

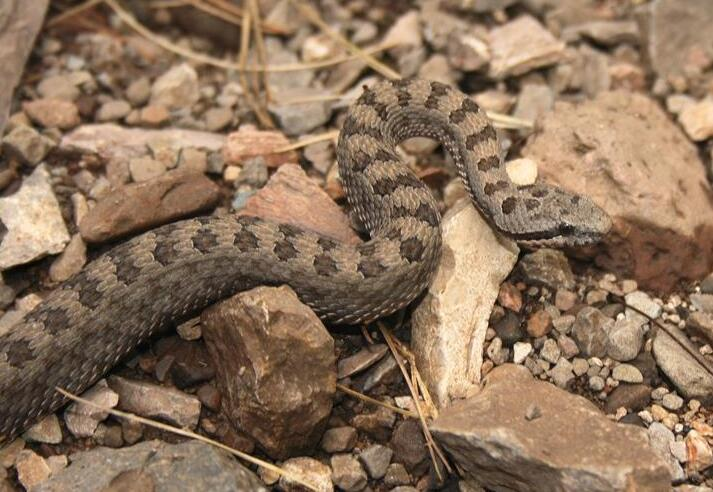
Western twin-spotted rattlesnake (Crotalus pricei pricei), Chihuahua, Mexico

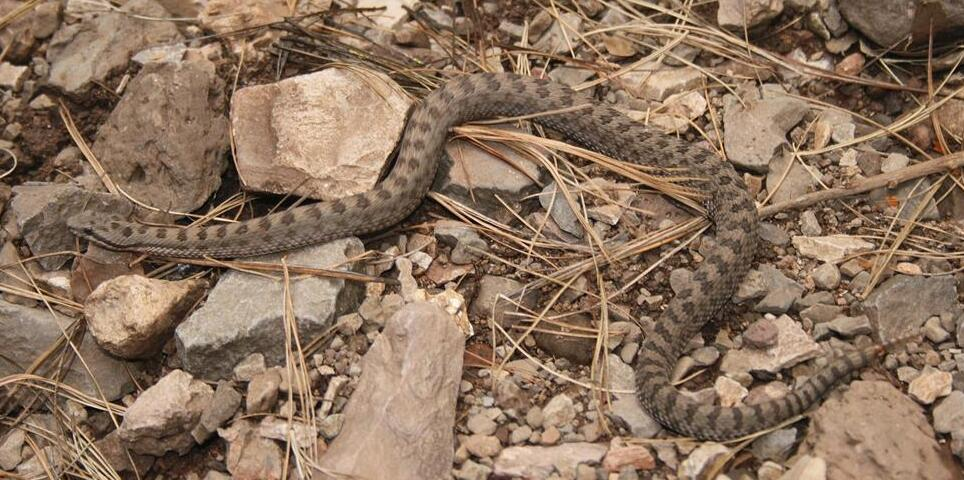
Western twin-spotted rattlesnake (Crotalus pricei pricei), Chihuahua, Mexico

Common names: twin-spotted rattlesnake, western twin-spotted rattlesnake, more

Crotalus pricei is a species of venomous snake, a pit viper in the family Viperidae. The species is endemic to the southwestern United States and northern Mexico. Two subspecies are recognized.

== Etymology ==
The specific name, pricei, is in honor of William Wightman "Billy" Price (1871–1922), a field biologist, who collected the first specimens which became the type series.

== Description ==
Adults of C. pricei usually do not exceed 50–60 cm (about 20–24 in) in total length (including tail). The maximum total length recorded is 66 cm (26 in).

The color pattern consists of a gray, bluish-gray, brownish-gray, or medium- to reddish-brown ground color, usually with a fine brown speckling. This is overlaid with a series of dorsal blotches that tend to be divided down the median line to form 39–64 pairs.

== Behavior ==
Amid the mountain rocks where it lives, this small snake may rattle furiously at passing humans yet never be heard. The nights are often cold where it lives. It is driven by hunger, seeking out small rodents and lizards. Though its pattern looks bizarre its protective coloration blends well with the light and shadow of the mountains. Although it has been conjectured that it has a venom of high potency, little is known - there are no recorded bites to humans from this snake.

== Common names ==
Common names for C. pricei include twin-spotted rattlesnake, western twin-spotted rattlesnake, Price's rattlesnake, Arizona spotted rattlesnake, spotted rattlesnake, and Arizona twin-spotted rattlesnake.

== Geographic range ==
C. pricei is found in the United States in southeastern Arizona. In northern Mexico, it occurs in the Sierra Madre Occidental in Sonora, Chihuahua, and Durango. It has also been found in the Sierra Madre Oriental in southeastern Coahuila, Nuevo León, and Tamaulipas, with isolated records in San Luis Potosí and Aguascalientes. The type locality given is "Huachuca Mts., Arizona" (Cochise County, Arizona, United States).

== Conservation status ==
This species, C. pricei, is classified as Least Concern on the IUCN Red List of Threatened Species (v3.1, 2001). Species are listed as such due to their wide distribution, presumed large population, or because they are unlikely to be declining fast enough to qualify for listing in a more threatened category. The population trend was stable when assessed in 2007.

== Subspecies ==
Subspecies	Taxon author	Common name	Geographic range
C. p. miquihuanus	Gloyd, 1940	Eastern twin-spotted rattlesnake	Mexico: southeastern Coahuila, Nuevo León and Tamaulipas
C. p. pricei	Van Denburgh, 1895	Western twin-spotted rattlesnake, Arizona twin-spotted rattlesnake	United States: southeastern Arizona, Mexico: Sonora, Chihuahua and Durango
