= Crotalus pricei miquihuanus =

Scientific classification
- Kingdom: Animalia
- Phylum: Chordata
- Order: Squamata
- Suborder: Serpentes
- Family: Viperidae
- Genus: Crotalus
- Species: C. pricei
- Subspecies: C. p. miquihuanus

Trinomial name
- Crotalus pricei miquihuanus Gloyd, 1940

Subspecies of Mexican Twin Spotted Rattlesnake

Crotalus pricei miquihuanus, the eastern twin spotted rattlesnake, is a subspecies of twin spotted rattlesnake native to, Mexico. As with all rattlesnakes, it is venomous. The name 'miquihuanus' comes from the location it was originally described in, Miquihuana, Tamaulipas.

== Distinction ==
Crotalus pricei miquihuanus may be distinguished from its sister subspecies in a few ways. Colour and pattern may be inconsistently different, but more consistently C. p. miquihuanus has a smaller count of specific scales such as ventrals and prefrontal scales.

== Reproduction ==
Crotalus pricei miquihuanus is known to be ovoviviparous.
