= Ophryacus smaragdinus =

Scientific classification
- Kingdom: Animalia
- Phylum: Chordata
- Class: Reptilia
- Order: Squamata
- Suborder: Serpentes
- Family: Viperidae
- Genus: Ophryacus
- Species: O. smaragdinus

Binomial name
- Ophryacus smaragdinus Grünwald, Jones, Franz-Chávez & Ahumada-Carrillo, 2015

Synonyms
- Ophryacus undulatus Flores-Villela et al. (1992); Ophryacus undulatus Camarillo (1995); Ophryacus undulatus Campbell and Lamar (2004); Ophryacus undulatus Mendoza-Paz et al. (2006); Ophryacus undulatus Ramírez-Bautista et al. (2010); Ophryacus undulatus Solano-Zavaleta et al. (2010); Ophryacus undulatus Ramírez-Bautista et al. (2014)

Species of snake

Common names: Emerald horned pit viper.

Ophryacus smaragdinus is a pit viper species endemic to the mountains of eastern Mexico. No subspecies are currently recognized.

== Etymology ==
The specific name Ophyracus is derived from the Greek language word ophrys (ὀφρύς), which means "brow" or "eyebrow", and the Latin word acus, which means "needle", an allusion to the characteristic horn-like scales over the eyes; smaragdinus (or "emerald-green" in English) is the Latinization of the Latin noun smaragdus, which itself derives from the earlier Greek noun σμάραγδος, meaning emerald, i.e., a sharp horned toad with an emerald-green colored body.

== Description ==
Adults grow to between 450 and 500 millimetres (17 3/4 and 19 5/8 inches) in length. No rattle. Supraocular horn is not in immediate contact with the eye. On lateral surfaces of head, a distinctive white, cream, or pale yellow triangular marking is present. Head wide with a rounded blunt snout. There are 3–5 canthals present between the nasals and the supraocular scales. There are 1–4 keeled postrostral internasals. Loreal pit is divided. Ventrals 155–166, 3–5 postoculars, 3–5 suboculars, subcaudals 39–46, 7–9 supralabials and dorsal scale rows are 21-21-17.

Body emerald or olive green, which gives the common name. Sometimes it can be brown or tan. On dorsal surface, there are 37–46 dark blotches, which are outlined in black. In mid dorsal region, these dorsal blotches are broken to form an undulating dark stripe. Juveniles are grey in color. Tail which is 12 to 15 in the total body length, contains 5–12 pale bands. Head contains black spots and markings. A dark black-outlined postocular stripe is present.

== Geographic range ==
It is found in east-central Hidalgo, west-central Veracruz, northeastern Puebla, and north-central Oaxaca. Habitats include montane cloud forest, humid pine-oak woodland and pine forest with secondary vegetation.

== Behavior ==
Terrestrial and less arboreal.
