= Crotalus intermedius omiltemanus =

Scientific classification
- Domain: Eukaryota
- Kingdom: Animalia
- Phylum: Chordata
- Class: Reptilia
- Order: Squamata
- Suborder: Serpentes
- Family: Viperidae
- Genus: Crotalus
- Species: C. intermedius
- Subspecies: C. i. omiltemanus

Trinomial name
- Crotalus intermedius omiltemanus Günther, 1895

Synonyms
- Crotalus omiltemanus - Günther, 1895; Crotalus triseriatus omiltemanus - Klauber, 1938; Crotalus intermedius omiltemanus - Klauber, 1952; Crotalus omiltemanus omiltemanus - Shelford, 1963

Subspecies of snake

Common names: Omilteman small-headed rattlesnake.

Crotalus intermedius omiltemanus is a venomous pitviper subspecies found in Mexico in the state of Guerrero.

== Description ==
This subspecies can be distinguished from the typical form (C. i. intermedius) by its ventral scale count: 164 or more in males, and 170 or more in females.

== Geographic range ==
Found in Mexico, in Guerrero, in several places west of Chilpancingo, in the Sierra Madre del Sur mountains, including the areas that surround Omilteme, San Vincente, and Filo de Caballo. The type locality given is "Mexico, Omilteme in Guerrero."
