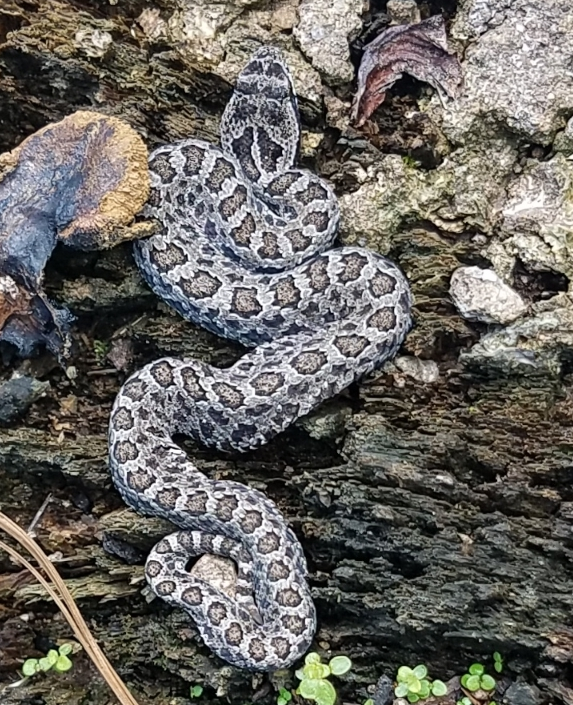
- A Mexican small-headed rattlesnake rests on rocks

Conservation status
- Least Concern (IUCN 3.1)

Scientific classification
- Domain: Eukaryota
- Kingdom: Animalia
- Phylum: Chordata
- Class: Reptilia
- Order: Squamata
- Suborder: Serpentes
- Family: Viperidae
- Genus: Crotalus
- Species: C. intermedius

Binomial name
- Crotalus intermedius Troschel, 1865
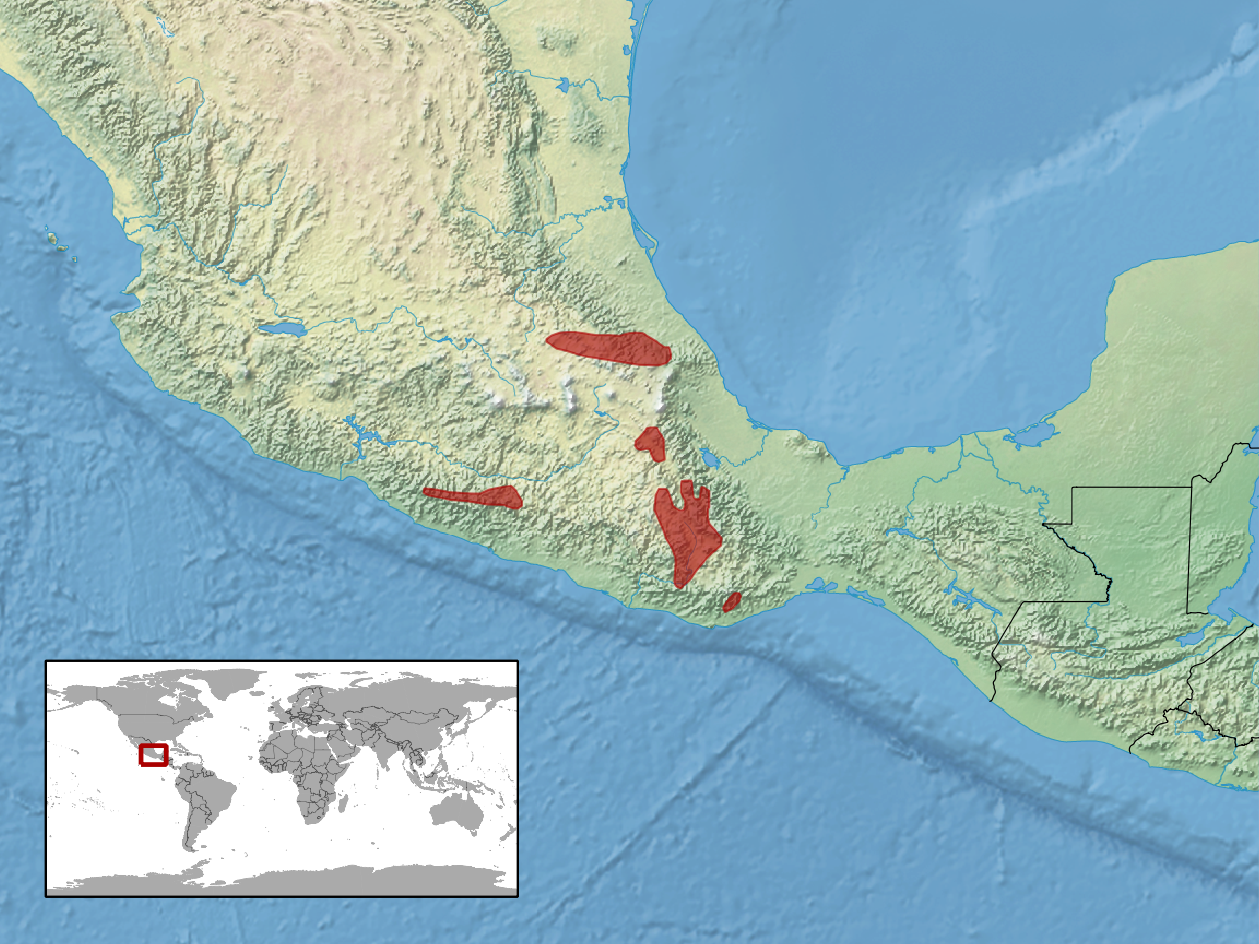

Synonyms
- Crotalus intermedius Troschel In Müller, 1865; Crotalus intermedius – Fischer, 1881; Sistrurus intermedius – Garman, 1884; Crotalus intermedius intermedius – Klauber, 1952

= Crotalus intermedius =

Species of snake

Crotalus intermedius (common name Mexican small-headed rattlesnake) is a pit viper species found in central and southern Mexico. Like all other pit vipers, it is venomous. Three subspecies are currently recognized, including the nominate subspecies described here.

== Description ==
This species grows to lengths of 50 to 60 cm (20 to 24 in). Males are somewhat larger than females. Klauber (1972) gives a maximum length of 57 cm (22 in), although captive specimens may grow larger.

== Distribution and habitat ==
This snake is found in central and southern Mexico, more specifically in southeastern Hidalgo, southern Tlaxcala, northeastern and south-central Puebla, west-central Veracruz, Oaxaca (in the Sierra Juárez, Cerro San Filipe and the surrounding mountains, Sierra de Cuatro Venados, Sierra Madre del Sur, and the Sierra de Mihuatlán), and in Guerrero (in the Sierra Madre del Sur, west of Chilpancingo). A type locality was not given in the original paper, but "Mexico" is inferred from the title. Smith and Taylor (1950) restricted it to "El Limón, Totalco, Veracruz, Mexico".

Much of the range of this species consists of seasonally dry pine-oak forest, but it has also been found in cloud forest near Omilteme in Guerrero, as well as in the desert near Cacaloapan in Puebla, and Pachuca in Hidalgo. It is found at elevations between 2,000 and 3,200 m.

== Conservation status ==
This species is classified as Least Concern on the IUCN Red List (v3.1, 2001). Species are listed as such due to their wide distribution, presumed large population, or because they are unlikely to be declining fast enough to qualify for listing in a more threatened category. The population trend was stable when assessed in 2007.

== Subspecies ==
Subspecies	Taxon author	Common name	Geographic range
C. i. intermedius	Troschel, 1865	Totalcan small-headed rattlesnake	Mexico, in southeastern Hidalgo, northeastern Puebla, west-central Veracruz, and southwestern Tlaxcala, type locality: "El Limón, Totalco, Veracruz, Mexico"
C. i. gloydi	Taylor, 1941	Oaxacan small-headed rattlesnake	South, central, and northern Oaxaca, and central Puebla, type locality: "Cero San Filipe (elevation 10,000 ft) near [15 km northwest of] Oaxaca, Oaxaca, Mexico"
C. i. omiltemanus	Günther, 1895	Omilteman small-headed rattlesnake	Guerrero, several areas west of Chilpancingo, type locality: "Mexico, Omilteme in Guerrero"
