= Trigonocephalus blomhoffii =

Trigonocephalus blomhoffii is a taxonomic synonym that may refer to:

- Gloydius blomhoffii, the mamushi, a venomous pitviper species found in China, Korea and Japan
- Gloydius intermedius, the Central Asian pitviper, a venomous pitviper species found in northern Asia
