= Agkistrodon monticola =

Agkistrodon monticola is a taxonomic synonym that may refer to:

- Ovophis monticola, a.k.a. the mountain pitviper, a venomous pitviper species found in Asia
- Gloydius monticola, a.k.a. the Likiang pitviper, a venomous pitviper found in southern China
