= Gloydius caraganus =

Scientific classification
- Kingdom: Animalia
- Phylum: Chordata
- Order: Squamata
- Suborder: Serpentes
- Family: Viperidae
- Genus: Gloydius
- Species: G. caraganus

Binomial name
- Gloydius caraganus (Eichwald, 1831)

Synonyms
- Trigonocephalus caraganus Eichwald, 1831

Species of Asian snake

Gloydius caraganus, or the Karaganda pitviper, is a species of Asian moccasin from Uzbekistan, Turkmenistan, Tajikistan and Kyrgyzstan. The name caraganus comes from the area in which it was first discovered. As all pit vipers, it is venomous. Previously considered a subspecies of G. halys, it has recently been elevated to full species.

== Description ==
The Karaganda pitviper can grow to above 74 cm in males and 53 cm in females. It has a curved snout and pale colouration with 36–50 dark bands.

== Reproduction ==
Gloydius caraganus is known to be viviparous.
