= Agkistrodon halys =

Agkistrodon halys is a taxonomic synonym that may refer to:

- Gloydius halys, a.k.a. the Siberian pit viper, a venomous pitviper species found within a wide range that stretches from Russia, east of the Urals, eastwards through China and also includes the southern Ryukyu Islands
- Gloydius saxatilis, a.k.a. the Amur viper, a venomous pitviper species found in Russia, China and the Korean Peninsula
