= Trigonocephalus halys =

Trigonocephalus halys is a taxonomic synonym that may refer to:

- Gloydius halys, a.k.a. the Siberian pit viper, a venomous pitviper species found in Russia and China
- Gloydius intermedius, a.k.a. the Central Asian pitviper, a venomous pitviper species found in northern Asia
