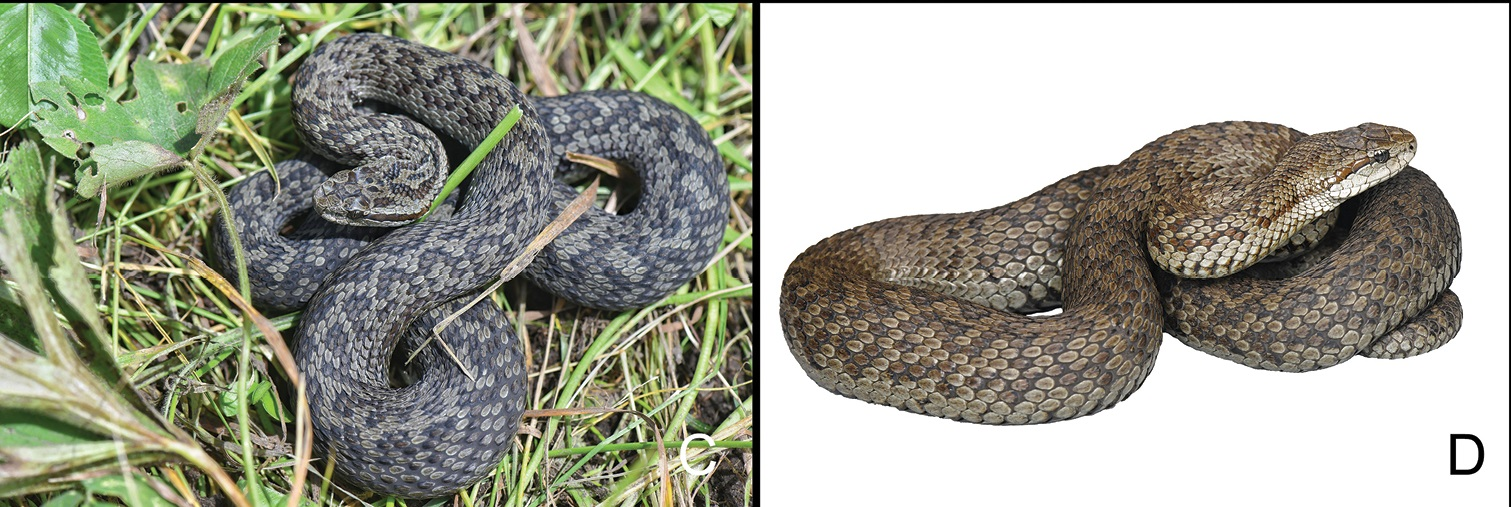

Scientific classification
- Kingdom: Animalia
- Phylum: Chordata
- Class: Reptilia
- Order: Squamata
- Suborder: Serpentes
- Family: Viperidae
- Genus: Gloydius
- Species: G. swild

Binomial name
- Gloydius swild Shi & Malhotra, 2021

= Gloydius swild =

Species of Chinese snake

Gloydius swild, the glacier pit viper, is a species of Asian moccasin from China. Like all pit vipers, it is venomous.

== Description ==
The glacier pit viper can be distinguished from other Asian moccasins by its striped markings as well as its dark zig-zagged marks along its back on its brown-grey or blue-grey base colouring, all on matte scales. It also has a triangular head, common for asian moccasins.

The specific name references the research group that discovered it (Southwest Wild, or "swild").

== Reproduction ==
The glacier pit viper is viviparous. The neonates are reported to be around 3.2 grams after their first shedding.
