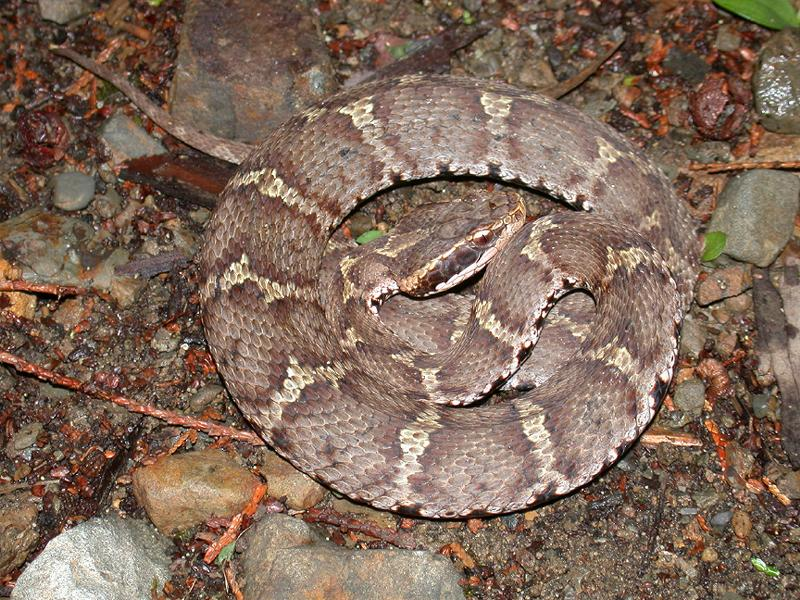
- Gloydius blomhoffii, Japanese mamushi

Scientific classification
- Kingdom: Animalia
- Phylum: Chordata
- Class: Reptilia
- Order: Squamata
- Suborder: Serpentes
- Family: Viperidae
- Subfamily: Crotalinae
- Genus: Gloydius; Hoge & Romano-Hoge, 1981

Synonyms
- Trigonocephalus — Kuhl & van Hasselt, 1822; Halys — Gray, 1849; Ancistrodon — Boulenger, 1896; Agkistrodon — Stejneger, 1907; Gloydius Hoge & Romano-Hoge, 1981; Gloydins [sic] Hoge & Romano-Hoge, 1983 (ex errore)

= Gloydius =

Genus of snakes

Gloydius is a genus of pit vipers endemic to Asia, also known as Asian moccasins or Asian ground pit vipers. Named after American herpetologist Howard K. Gloyd, this genus is very similar to the North American genus Agkistrodon. 24 species are currently recognized.

== Geographic range ==
Species of Gloydius are found in Russia, east of the Ural Mountains through Siberia, Iran, Himalayas from Pakistan, India, Nepal, China, Korea, Japan and the Ryukyu Islands.

== Species ==
Species	Taxon author	Subsp.*	Common name	Geographic range
G. angusticeps	J. Shi, Yang, Huang, Orlov & P. Li, 2018	0	Zoige pit viper	China, (Sichuan, Qinghai, and Gansu).
G. blomhoffii	(H. Boie, 1826)	0	Japanese mamushi	Japan.
G. brevicauda	(Stejneger, 1907)	0	Short-tailed mamushi	North Korea, South Korea, and China.
G. caraganus	(Eichwald, 1831)	0	Karaganda pitviper	Uzbekistan, Turkmenistan, Tajikistan, Kyrgyzstan, and Kazakhstan.
G. caucasicus	(Nikolsky, 1916)	0	Caucasian pitviper	Turkmenistan, Azerbaijan, Iran, and Afghanistan.
G. chambensis	Kuttalam, Santra, Owens, Selvan, Mukherjee, Graham, Togridou, Bharti, Shi, Shanker & Malhotra, 2022	0	Chamba pitviper	Chamba District, Himachal Pradesh.
G. changdaoensis	L. Li, 1999	0		China.
G. cognatus	(Gloyd, 1977)	0	Alashan pitviper	China.
G. halys^{T}	(Pallas, 1776)	4	Siberian pitviper	Russia, east of the Ural Mountains through Siberia, Iran, Mongolia to northern and central China, as well as the southern Ryukyu Islands.
G. himalayanus	(Günther, 1864)	0	Himalayan pitviper	Along the southern slopes of the Himalayas from northeastern Pakistan, to northern India (Kashmir, Punjab) and Nepal. Found at 1524–3048 m altitude.
G. huangi	K. Wang, Ren, Dong, Jiang, Shi, Siler & Che, 2019	0	Lancang Plateau viper	Tibet.
G. intermedius	(Strauch, 1868)	0	Central Asian pitviper	Southeastern Azerbaijan, northern Iran, southern Turkmenistan, northwestern Afghanistan, southern Russia, northwestern China and Mongolia.
G. lateralis	Zhang, S. Shi, C. Li, Yan, P. Wang, Ding, Du, Plenković-Moraj, Jiang & J. Shi, 2022	0		Jiuzhaigou County, China.
G. lipipengi	J. Shi, J-C. Liu & Malhotra, 2021	0	Nujiang pit viper	China.
G. liupanensis	N. Liu, Z. Song & Luo, 1989	0		Gansu, China.
G. monticola	(F. Werner, 1922)	0	Likiang pitviper	The mountains of northern Yunnan in China.
G. qinlingensis	(M. Song & F. Chen, 1985)	0		Shaanxi, China.
G. rickmersi	Wagner, Tiutenko, Borkin & Simonov, 2015	0		Kyrgyzstan
G. rubromaculatus	J. Shi, P.Li & J. Liu, 2017	0		Tibetan Plateau.
G. saxatilis	(Emelianov, 1937)	0	Rock mamushi	Russia (eastern Siberia), northeastern China and North and South Korea.
G. shedaoensis	(Zhao, 1979)	0	Shedao island pitviper	Shedao Island, off the coast of Liaotung, China.
G. stejnegeri	(Rendahl, 1933)	0	Gobi pitviper	China and Mongolia.
G. strauchi	(Bedriaga, 1912)	0	Strauch's pitviper	The Tibetan Plateau in the provinces of Tsinghai and western Szechwan, China.
G. swild	J. Shi & Malhotra, 2021	0		China.
G. tsushimaensis	(Isogawa, Moriya & Mitsui, 1994)	0	Tsushima Island pitviper	Tsushima Island, Japan.
G. ussuriensis	(Emelianov, 1929)	0	Ussuri mamushi	Far east Russia (Primorskiy Kray), northeastern China, North and South Korea, as well as Quelpart Island.

(*) Not including the nominate subspecies.
(^{T}) Type species.

In the above list, a taxon author in parentheses indicates that the species was originally described in a different genus.

== Taxonomy ==
Due to the strong morphological similarity, these snakes were classified in the genus Agkistrodon until very recently. However, by 1999 cladistic studies clearly showed that Agkistrodon did not form a clade (indeed, it was not even paraphyletic) and was thus split into several genera.

A new species, G. tsushimaensis, was described by Isogawa, Moriya & Mitsui (1994). It is referred to as the Tsushima island pitviper and is found only on Tsushima Island, Japan.
