= Gloydius angusticeps =

Scientific classification
- Kingdom: Animalia
- Phylum: Chordata
- Class: Reptilia
- Order: Squamata
- Suborder: Serpentes
- Family: Viperidae
- Genus: Gloydius
- Species: G. angusticeps

Binomial name
- Gloydius angusticeps Shi, Yang, Huang, Orlov & Li, 2018

Species of Snake

Gloydius angusticeps, the Zoige pit viper, is a species of venomous snake in the genus Gloydius found in China, specifically in the provinces of Sichuan, Qinghai, and Gansu.

== Etymology ==
The specific name, angusticeps, is derived from the Latin words "angusti-" meaning "long and narrow" and "-ceps" meaning "headed", indicating that this species has a longer and narrower head compared to other members of the Gloydius strauchi complex.

== Geographical range ==
The Zoige pit viper is found in China, specifically in the provinces of Sichuan, Qinghai, and Gansu. This species inhabits high-altitude regions, typically ranging from 3150 to 3653 meters above sea level.
