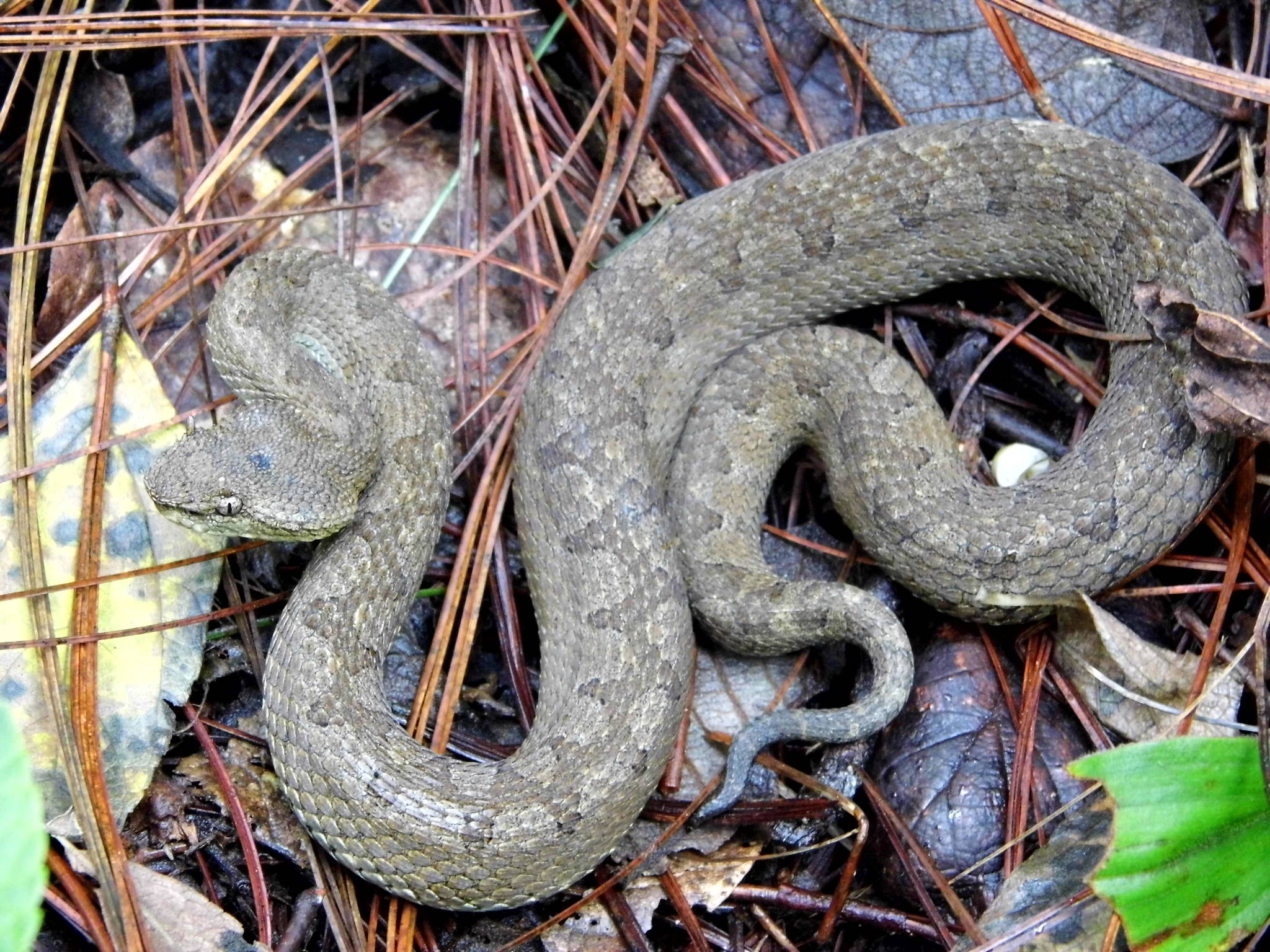

Scientific classification
- Kingdom: Animalia
- Phylum: Chordata
- Class: Reptilia
- Order: Squamata
- Suborder: Serpentes
- Family: Viperidae
- Subfamily: Crotalinae
- Genus: Ophryacus; Cope, 1887

= Ophryacus =

Genus of snakes

Common names: Mexican horned pitvipers.

Ophryacus is a genus of pit vipers endemic to Mexico. The name is derived from the Greek word ophrys (ὀφρύς), which means "brow", and the Latin word acus, which means "needle", an allusion to the characteristic horn-like scales over the eyes. Currently, three species are recognized and no subspecies.

== Description ==
The larger of the two species, O. undulatus, grows to between 55 and 70 cm (22 and 28 in) in length. They are characterized by the presence of a single scale over the eye that takes the shape of either a long and relatively slender spine, or a flattened horn. Often, other supraocular scales are also shaped in such a way that they project slightly.

== Geographic range ==
They are restricted to the mountains of eastern, central and southern Mexico.

== Species ==
Species	Taxon author	Common name	Geographic range
O. smaragdinus	Grünwald, Jones, Franz-Chávez & Ahumada-Carrillo, 2015	Emerald Horned Pitviper	Eastern Mexico.
O. sphenophrys	(L. Müller, 1924)	Broad-horned Pitviper	The mountains of Oaxaca.
O. undulatus^{T}	(Jan, 1859)	Slender-horned Pitviper	The mountains of central and southern Mexico (Hidalgo, Veracruz, Oaxaca, and Guerrero) west of the Isthmus of Tehuantepec at elevations of 1800–2800 m (5,900–9200 feet).

^{T}) Type species.
