= Diploderma vela =

Conservation status
- Least Concern (IUCN 3.1)

Scientific classification
- Kingdom: Animalia
- Phylum: Chordata
- Class: Reptilia
- Order: Squamata
- Suborder: Iguania
- Family: Agamidae
- Genus: Diploderma
- Species: D. vela

Binomial name
- Diploderma vela (Wang, Jiang, Pan, Siler and Che, 2015)

Synonyms
- Japalura vela Wang, Jiang, Pan, Siler and Che, 2015

Species of Asian Lizard

Diploderma vela, also known as sail mountain lizard, the mountain dragon or sail japalura, is a species of lizard endemic to China. It is named after its distinct sail, with 'Vela' in Latin meaning sail. It can be found in Tibet and Yunnan at elevations of 2,370 meters.

It was previously considered a member of the genus Japalura.

== Description ==
The sail mountain lizard is a small lizard (5.6 to 6.9 cm). It has moderately-sized hind limbs, a long and flat head and a long and slender cylindrical tail. It can be distinguished by its irregular scales, gular sac, a lateral fold of skin in the axilla–groin region as well as a transverse gular fold and a gular pouch and a concealed tympanum.

In males it displays a pronounced sail-like vertebral crest along the length of the body and a dorsally black and ventrally white colouration. There is also jagged yellow-white dorsolateral stripes displayed in males. In females there is no sail and it is medium to dark brown in colouration. There is also faint reddish dorsolateral lines in the anterior half of the axilla-groin region in females.

It displays white transverse streaks on the head as well as black radiated markings around the eyes. Ventrally, the head is patterned with prominent black stripes.

== Behaviour ==
Sail mountain lizards are often found in rocky mountain areas or in steppe-shrubs.

Adult males are territorial and can often be seen basking on the top of rocks while females and juveniles tend to stay near the bottoms of the rocks. When another male invades a territory, the territory holder will nod at the invader, displaying his gular pouch. If the invader refuses to leave the two males will fight.

== Possible predators ==
Some possible predators are snakes from the area, such as the Chinese Beauty Snake and the Lancang Plateau Viper, as well as large birds such as Corvus species.
