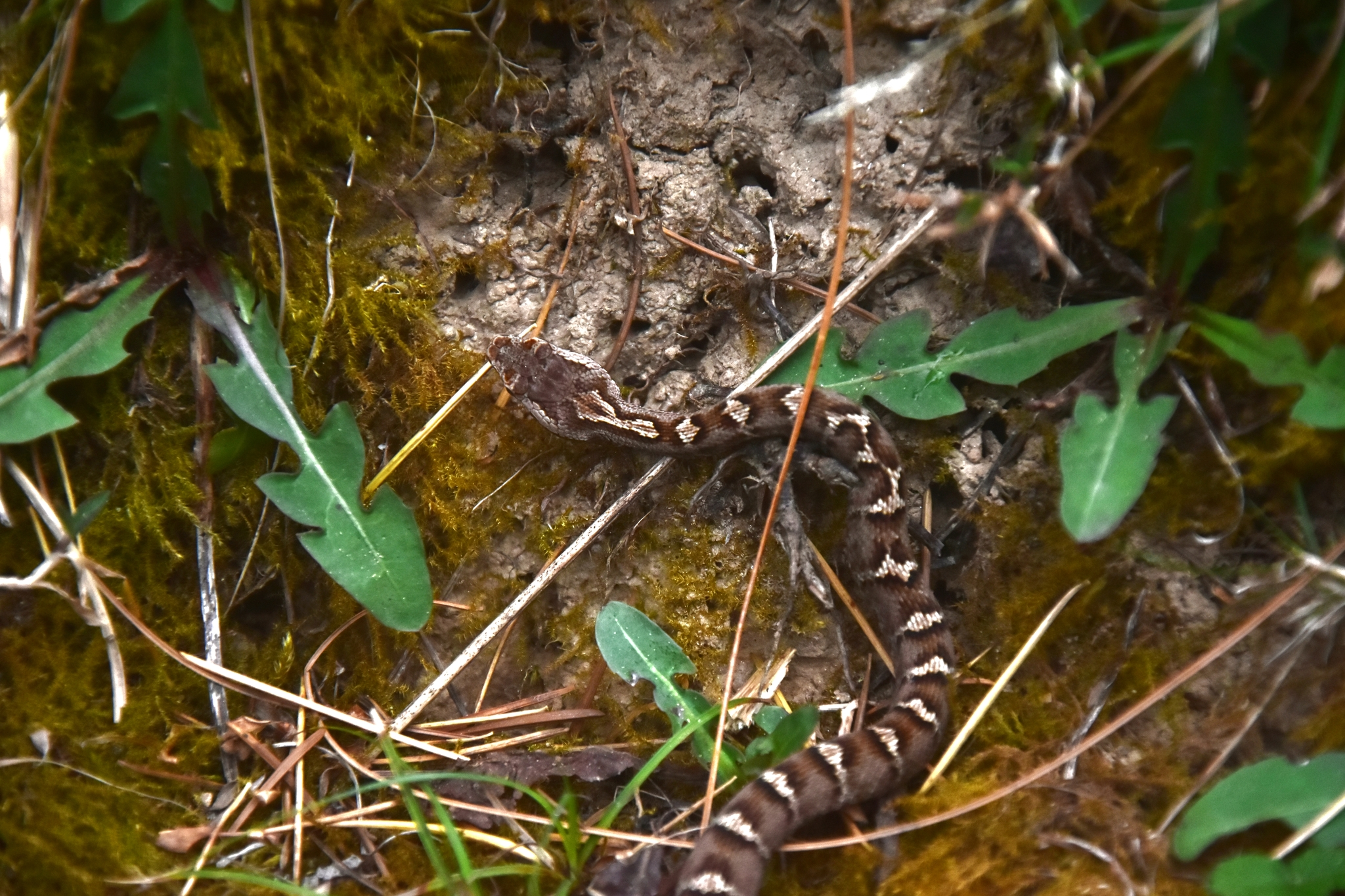
- Gloydius himalayanus

Scientific classification
- Kingdom: Animalia
- Phylum: Chordata
- Class: Reptilia
- Order: Squamata
- Suborder: Serpentes
- Family: Viperidae
- Genus: Gloydius
- Species: G. himalayanus

Binomial name
- Gloydius himalayanus (Günther, 1864)

Synonyms
- Trigonocephalus affinis – Günther, 1860 (part); Halys himalayanus Günther, 1864; Halys Himalayanus – Stoliczka, 1870; Halys Hymalayanus Stoliczka, 1870 (ex errore); Trigonocephalus himalayanus – Strauch, 1873; Crotalus Halys Himalayanus – Higgins, 1873; Ancistrodon himalayanus – Boulenger, 1890; Agkistrodon himalayanus – Hatta, 1928; A[gkistrodon]. himalayana – Underwood, 1979; Gloydius himalayanus – Hoge & Romano-Hoge, 1981

= Gloydius himalayanus =

Species of snake

Gloydius himalayanus also known as the Himalayan pit viper or the Himalayan viper is a pit viper species found along the southern slopes of the Himalayas in Pakistan, India and Nepal. No subspecies are currently recognized. Himalayan pit vipers have been found up to 4900m above sea level, which makes it the highest living snake ever found.

== Description ==
Its body color is light brown or dark brown. On the upper side of the body there are long infarct marks which seem to be intertwined due to their close proximity. Slightly larger, side row of spots of the same color. Dark spots on the head, abdomen is light gray in color. There are small dark spots on the abdomen.

The head is distinctly wide and elongated, with symmetrically arranged large scales. The dorsal scales are strongly keeled. An elongated postocular extends anteriorly to separate the eye from the supralabials. The dorsum is brownish, mottled or variegated to form a pattern of transverse bars. Ventral scales are white with black and red dots or speckles. Average length of these snakes is between 0.76 and 0.90 metres (2.5 and 3.0 ft). Dorsal scale count is "(20 to 23) - 21 (19 to 23) - 17 (15)", which means behind head, 20-23 rows; at midbody, usually 21 rows, but sometimes 19 or 23; just before vent, usually 17 rows, but sometimes 15.

== Distribution ==
Occurs along the southern slopes of the Himalayas from northeastern Pakistan, to northern India (Jammu and Kashmir, Punjab, Ladakh and Uttarakhand) and Nepal. Reports that this species occurs in Sikkim, India, need to be confirmed. It is the only pit viper found in Pakistan .

== Habitat ==
This is a highland snake and is found in altitudes ranging from 2,100 to 4,900 m (6,900 to 16,100 ft) in the mid and western Himalayas. It takes refuge under fallen timber, crevices, in or under rocks, beneath boulders, ledges, stones and fallen leaves.

== Behavior and diet ==
This is a nocturnal and terrestrial species, often seen close to its hiding place, to which it retreats when disturbed. It is a lazy timid snake, moving slowly from one place to another. Its food consists mostly of millipedes, centipedes, and small rodents.

== Venom ==
Bites from this species result in intense local pain and swelling, which usually subsides within two to three days, even without treatment.
