= Aspergillus intermedius =

Scientific classification
- Kingdom: Fungi
- Division: Ascomycota
- Class: Eurotiomycetes
- Order: Eurotiales
- Family: Aspergillaceae
- Genus: Aspergillus
- Species: A. intermedius

Binomial name
- Aspergillus intermedius Blaser (1975)

Species of fungus

Aspergillus intermedius is a species of fungus in the genus Aspergillus. It is from the Aspergillus section. The species was first described in 1975. It has been reported to produce asperflavin, auroglaucin, dihydroauroglaucin, echinulins, epiheveadrides, flavoglaucin, isoechinulins, LL-S491β, neoechinulins, physcion, questin, and tetrahydroauroglaucin.

== Growth and morphology ==
A. intermedius has been cultivated on both Czapek yeast extract agar (CYA) plates and Malt Extract Agar Oxoid® (MEAOX) plates. The growth morphology of the colonies can be seen in the pictures below.

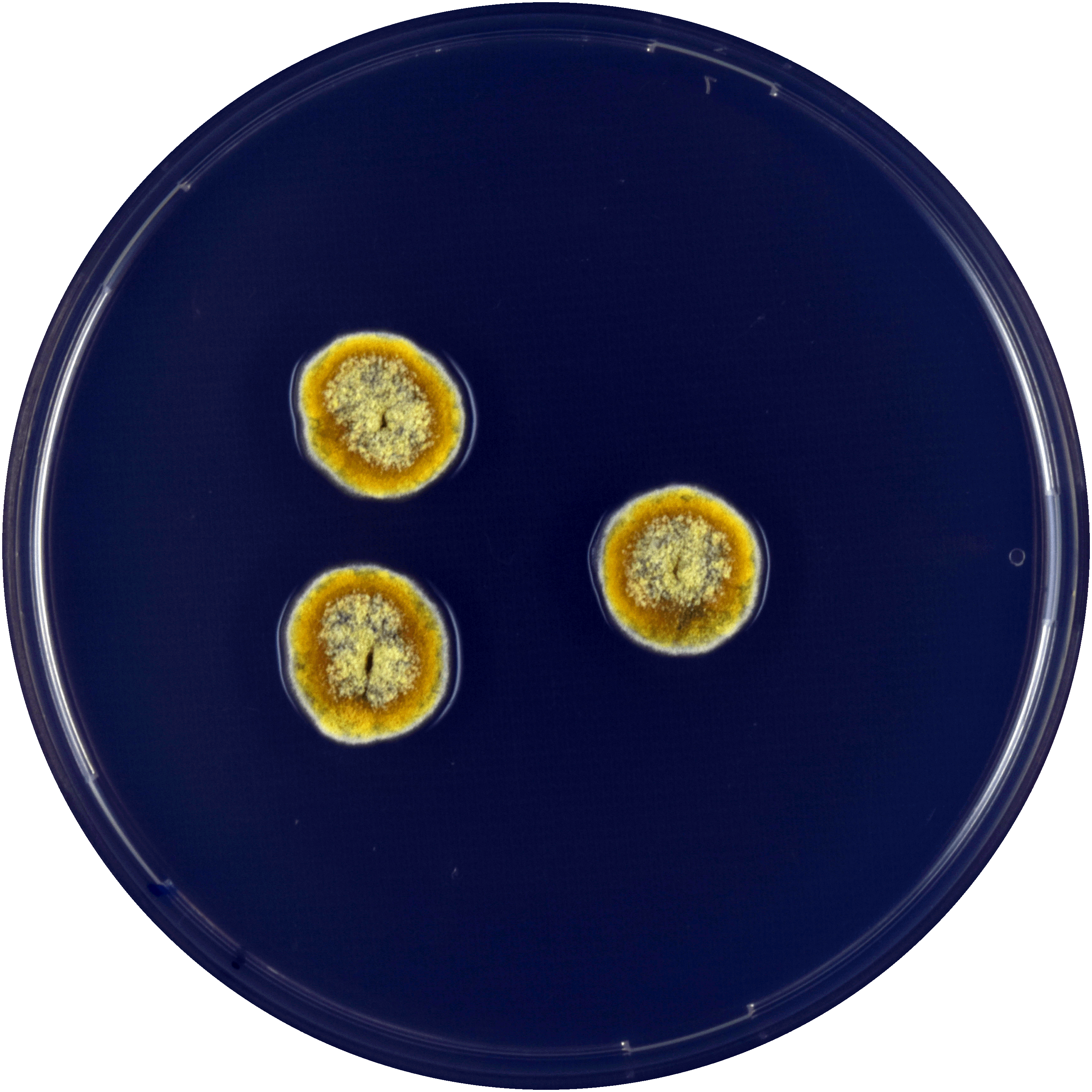
Aspergillus intermedius growing on CYA plate

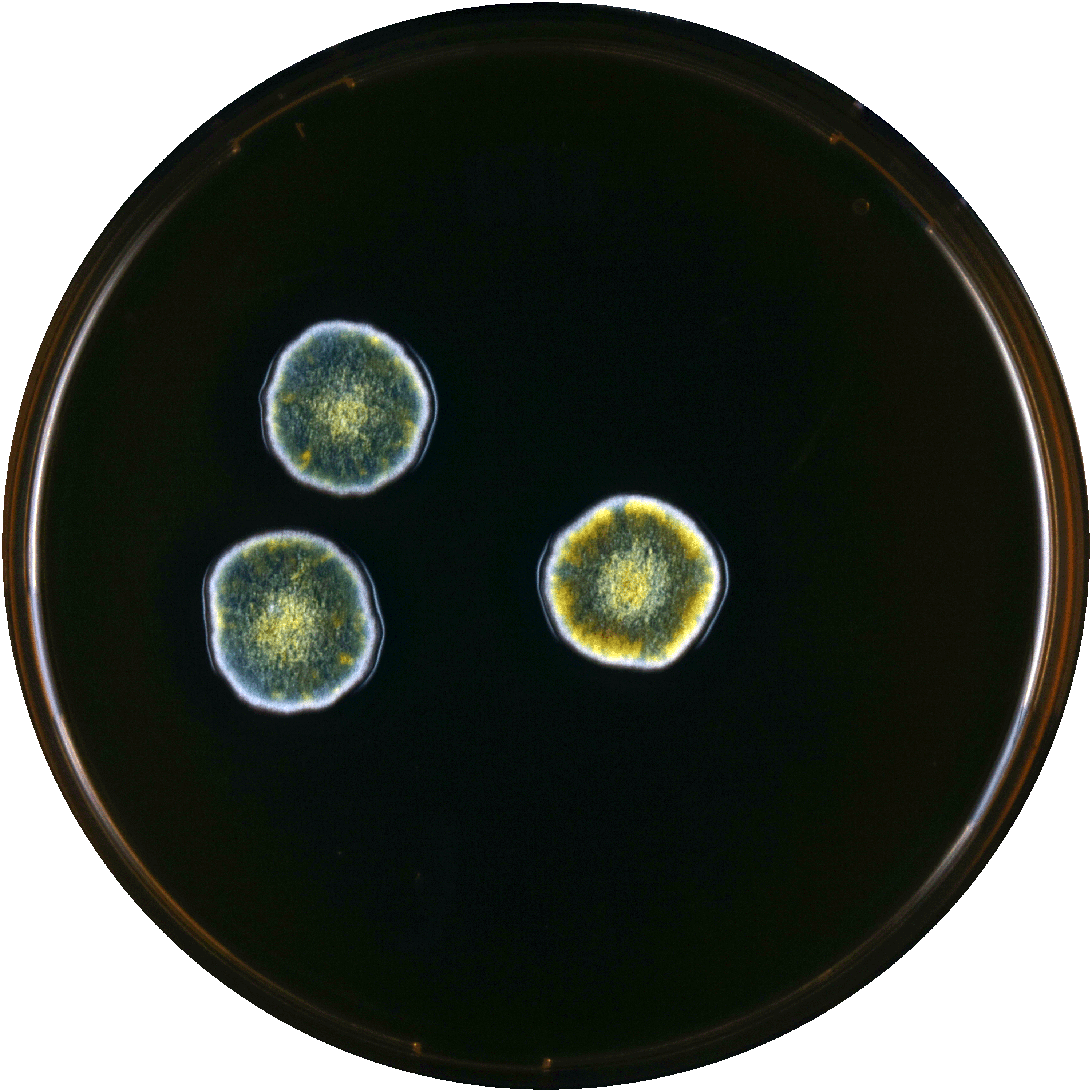
Aspergillus intermedius growing on MEAOX plate
