= Gloydius caucasicus =

Scientific classification
- Kingdom: Animalia
- Phylum: Chordata
- Class: Reptilia
- Order: Squamata
- Suborder: Serpentes
- Family: Viperidae
- Genus: Gloydius
- Species: G. caucasicus

Binomial name
- Gloydius caucasicus (Nikolsky, 1916)

Species of snake

Gloydius caucasicus, the Caucasian pit viper, is a species of venomous snake in the genus Gloydius found in Turkmenistan, Azerbaijan, Iran, and Afghanistan.

== Etymology ==
The specific name, caucasicus, is derived from the Caucasus region, where this species is commonly found.

== Description ==
The average length of mature individuals is up to 750 mm. The body pattern consists of a pale gray or brown background, overlaid with 36-50 dark transverse bands that do not extend low on the sides. These bands are separated by relatively broad light areas. The head is typically dark brown or black, with beige or pale-gray sides.

== Geographical range ==
The Caucasian pit viper (Gloydius caucasicus) is found in Turkmenistan, Azerbaijan, Iran, and Afghanistan. This species inhabits a variety of environments, including rocky areas and mountainous regions.
