= Gloydius stejnegeri =

Scientific classification
- Kingdom: Animalia
- Phylum: Chordata
- Class: Reptilia
- Order: Squamata
- Suborder: Serpentes
- Family: Viperidae
- Genus: Gloydius
- Species: G. stejnegeri

Binomial name
- Gloydius stejnegeri (Rendahl, 1933)

Species of snake

Gloydius stejnegeri, the Gobi pit viper, is a species of venomous snake in the genus Gloydius found in China and Mongolia.

== Etymology ==
The specific name, stejnegeri, is in honor of Norwegian-born American herpetologist Leonhard Stejneger.

== Description ==
The average length of mature individuals is up to 625 mm. The body pattern consists of a pale gray or brown background, overlaid with a series of dark, irregularly-shaped blotches. These blotches are bordered with black and often have lighter centers. The head is typically dark brown or black, with beige or pale-gray sides.

== Geographical range ==
The Gobi pit viper (Gloydius stejnegeri) is found in China and Mongolia. This species inhabits a variety of environments, including deserts and rocky areas.
