= Huangshan University =

University in Huangshan, China

Huangshan University (Chinese: 黄山学院), located in Huangshan, Anhui Province, China, is an institution of higher learning under jurisdiction of Anhui Province.

The university was founded in 1978 as Huangshan Specialized Normal School. Upon the approval of Ministry of Education in April 2002, it was elevated and renamed Huangshan University, affiliated to the Education Bureau of Anhui Province.

Huangshan University has a land area of 120,000,0 sq meters. By July 2014, there are 18000 full-time students in this university.
