= Streptomyces intermedius =

Scientific classification
- Domain: Bacteria
- Kingdom: Bacillati
- Phylum: Actinomycetota
- Class: Actinomycetes
- Order: Streptomycetales
- Family: Streptomycetaceae
- Genus: Streptomyces
- Species: S. intermedius

Binomial name
- Streptomyces intermedius (Krüger 1904) Waksman 1953 (Approved Lists 1980)

Type strain
- AS 4.1467, ATCC 25461, ATCC 3329, BCRC 13706, CBS 101.21, CBS 694.69, CCRC 13706, CGMCC 4.1467, DSM 40372, ETH 16705, ETH 28546, ICMP 12540, ICSSB 1007, IFO 13049, IMET 41384, IMRU 3329, ISP 5372, JCM 4197, JCM 4483, KCC S-0197, KCC S-0483, Lanoot R-8664, LMG 19304, NBRC 13049, NRRL B-1327, NRRL B-2670, NRRL-ISP 5372, PSA 96, R-8664, RIA 1241

Synonyms
- "Actinomyces intermedius" (Krüger 1904) Wollenweber 1920; "Oospora intermedia" Krüger 1904

Species of bacterium

Streptomyces intermedius is a bacterium species from the genus of Streptomyces which was isolated from soil. It is a common bacteria that is associated with serious diseases.

== See also ==
- List of Streptomyces species
