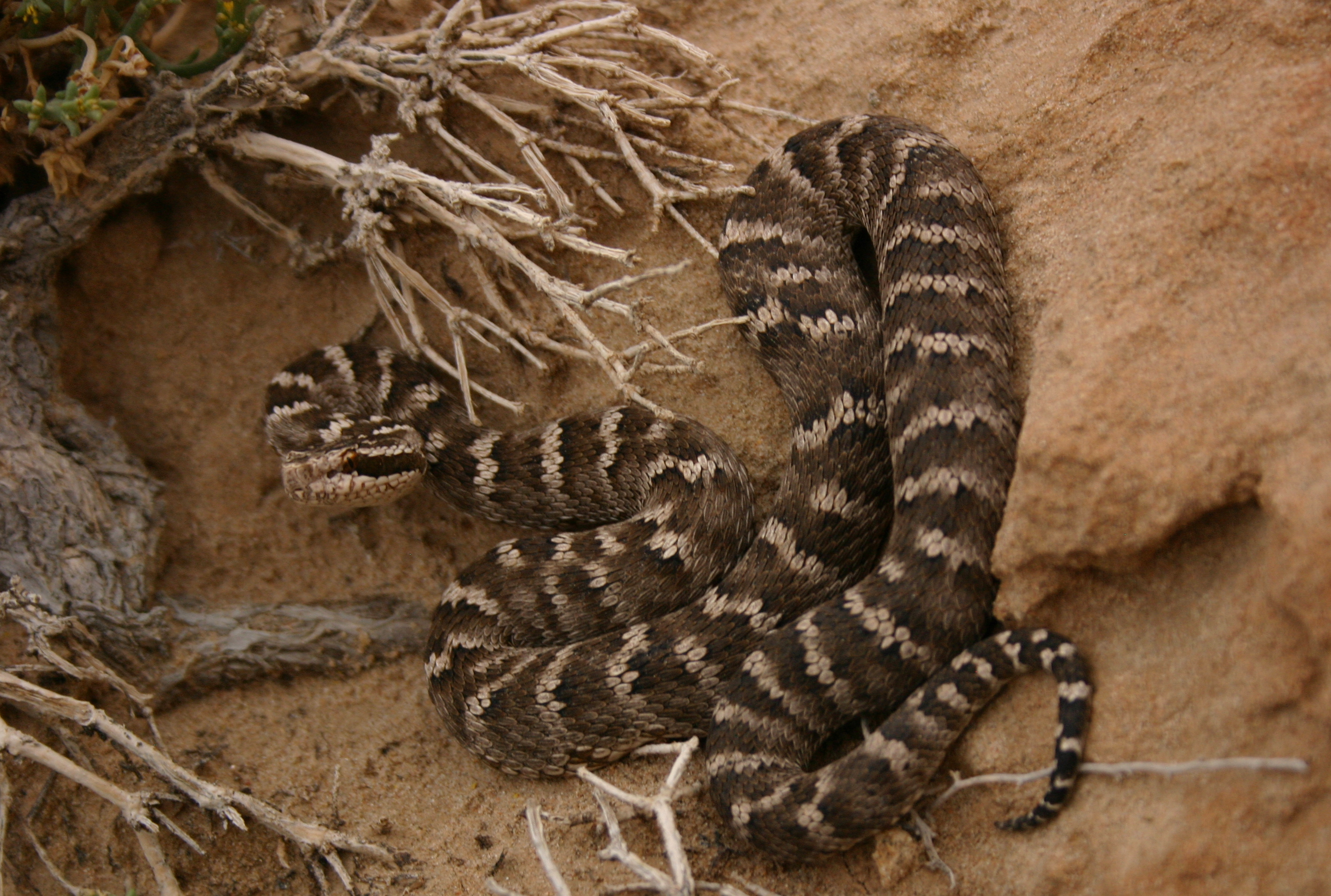
- In Gobi Desert, Mongolia

Scientific classification
- Kingdom: Animalia
- Phylum: Chordata
- Class: Reptilia
- Order: Squamata
- Suborder: Serpentes
- Family: Viperidae
- Genus: Gloydius
- Species: G. intermedius

Binomial name
- Gloydius intermedius (Strauch, 1868)

Synonyms
- List: Trigonocephalus halys – Ménétries, 1832 (part); Trigonocephalus blomhoffii – Maack, 1859 (part); Trigonocephalus affinis – Günther, 1860 (part); Trigonocephalus intermedius Strauch, 1868; Halys intermedius – W. Peters, 1877; Ancistrodon intermedius – Boulenger, 1896; Agkistrodon blomhoffii intermedius – Stejneger, 1907; Ancistrodon blomhoffii intermedius – Despax, 1913; Ancistrodon halys intermedius – Nikolski, 1916; Agkistrodon halys intermedius – Stejneger, 1925; Ankistrodon halys intermedius – Pavloff, 1926; Agkistrodon intermedius – F. Werner, 1929; Ancistrodon halys intermedius viridis – Pavloff, 1932 (nomen illegitimum); Gloydius halys intermedius – Hoge & Romano-Hoge, 1981; Agkistrodon intermedius intermedius – Gloyd & Conant, 1982; Gloydius intermedius – Kraus, Mink & W.M. Brown, 1996

= Gloydius intermedius =

Species of snake

Gloydius intermedius, or Central Asian pit viper, is a venomous species of pitviper endemic to northern Asia.

== Description ==
Gloyd and Conant (1990) reported examining subadults and adults of G. intermedius that were 33.5–71 cm (13.2–28.0 in) in total length. Nikolsky (1916) mentioned that some individuals may reach as much as 78 cm (30.5 in) in total length. The body is relatively stout, and the snout is not upturned.

The scalation includes 7 supralabial scales, 23 rows of keeled dorsal scales at midbody, 149-165 ventral scales, and 32-48 subcaudal scales.

The color pattern is variable, but generally consists of 28-45 dark subquadrate dorsal blotches or crossbands that usually extend down the flanks as far as the first or second scale rows. Between these blotches are irregular light areas. A dark brown to black postorbital stripe is present, extending from the eye back to the angle of the jaw, outlined by a light line above, and by cream-colored supralabial scales below.

== Common names ==
Common names for G. intermedius include Central Asian pit viper, intermediate mamushi, Mongolian pit viper, Central Asian pitviper.

== Previous Subspecies ==
The status of previous subspecies is controversial, but none are currently recognised, with G. caucasicus and G. stejnegeri being elevated to full species.

== Geographic range ==
G. intermedius is found in southeastern Azerbaijan, northern Iran, southern Turkmenistan, northwestern Afghanistan, southern Russia, Korea, northwestern China and Mongolia. The type locality given by Stejneger (1907) is "Governm. Irkutsk, East Siberia." Golay et al. (1993) give "Yesso (= Esso) Island, banks of Amur River and Khinggan (= Hinggan Ling) Mountain Range."
