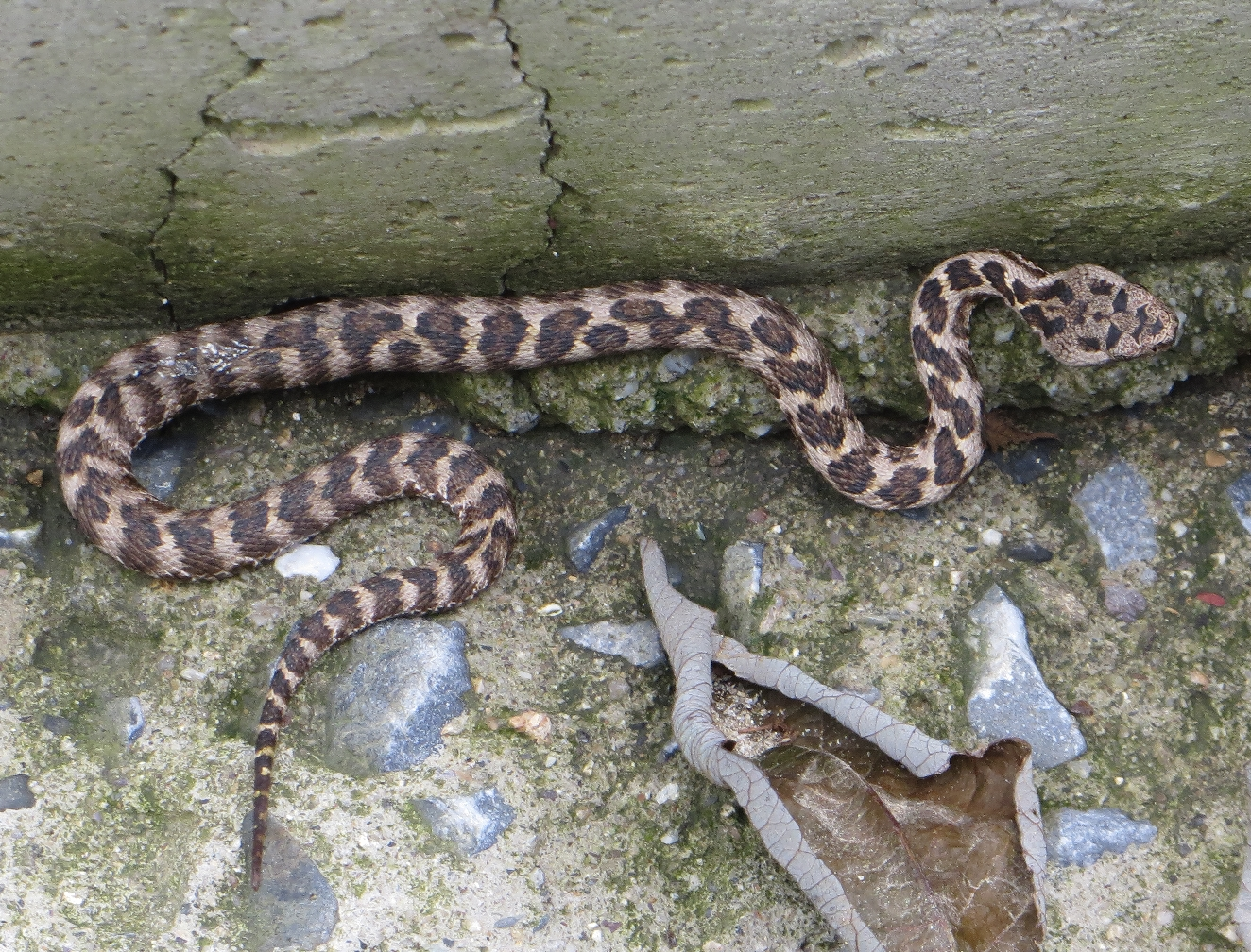
- Juvenile Sobaeksan National Park, S. Korea

Conservation status
- Least Concern (IUCN 3.1)

Scientific classification
- Kingdom: Animalia
- Phylum: Chordata
- Class: Reptilia
- Order: Squamata
- Suborder: Serpentes
- Family: Viperidae
- Genus: Gloydius
- Species: G. saxatilis

Binomial name
- Gloydius saxatilis (Emelianov, 1937)

Synonyms
- Trigonocephalus intermedius – Strauch, 1868 (part); Trigonocephalus intermedius – Strauch, 1873 (part); Ancistrodon intermedius – Boulenger, 1896 (part); Agkistrodon blomhoffii intermedius – Stejneger, 1907 (part); Ancistrodon halys intermedius – Nikolsky, 1916 (part); Agkistrodon halys intermedius – Stejneger, 1925 (part); Ancistrodon halys intermedius – Emelianov, 1929 (part); Agkistrodon halys intermedius – Maki, 1931 (part); Ancistrodon halys stejnegeri Rendahl, 1933 (part); Agkistrodon halys – Pope, 1935 (part); Agkistrodon halys – Okada, 1935 (part); Ancistrodon saxatilis Emelianov, 1937; Agkistrodon saxatilis – Gloyd, 1972; Agkistrodon shedoaensis continentalis Zhao, 1980; Gloydius saxatilis – Hoge & Romano-Hoge, 1981; Agkistrodon intermedius saxatilis – Gloyd & Conant, 1982; Agkistrodon saxatilis – Zhao & Adler, 1993; Gloydius saxatilis – McDiarmid, Campbell & Touré, 1999

= Gloydius saxatilis =

Species of snake

Common names: Amur viper, rock mamushi.

Gloydius saxatilis is a venomous pitviper species endemic to Russia, China and the Korean Peninsula. No subspecies are currently recognized.

== Description ==
It has a thicker body than other vipers. The top of the head has an inverted V-shaped marking, and lacks the white line markings of other vipers.

== Habitat ==
They can be found in the mountains, often near streams and in forests.

== Etymology ==
The specific name, saxatilis, means "found among rocks".

== Geographic range ==
Found in Russia (eastern Siberia), northeastern China and North and South Korea. Chernov (1934) proposed that the type locality be restricted to the "Suchan River (in Primorskiy Kray)".
