= Howard K. Gloyd =

American herpetologist

Howard Kay Gloyd (February 12, 1902 – August 7, 1978) was an American herpetologist who is credited with describing several new species and subspecies of reptiles, such as the Florida cottonmouth, Agkistrodon piscivorus conanti.

He is honored by having named after him the following taxa: a genus of Asian pit vipers, Gloydius; three species of nonvenomous snakes, Pantherophis gloydi (eastern fox snake), Agkistrodon howardgloydi, Heterodon nasicus gloydi (dusty hognose snake); and a subspecies of Central American pit viper, Crotalus intermedius gloydi.

Born in De Soto, Kansas, Gloyd attended Kansas State University for a year, and then attained his bachelor of science from Ottawa University in 1924. He taught biology at Ottawa University until 1927 when he went to teach zoology at the Agricultural College of Kansas State University. In 1928 he wrote The Amphibians and Reptiles of Franklin County, Kansas. In 1929, he attained his master's degree at Kansas State College, and went to Michigan to become a professor of zoology at the University of Michigan.

In 1936 he became director of the Chicago Academy of Sciences, a position which he would hold until 1958. In 1939, he became the vice president of the American Society of Ichthyologists and Herpetologists, and in 1940 he published The Rattlesnakes, genera Sistrurus and Crotalus. He organized numerous expeditions to Arizona to collect specimens for the Chicago Academy of Sciences. From 1940 until 1947, he was a consultant to the State Natural History Survey of Illinois. In 1942, he attained his doctorate at Ottawa University. In 1958 he moved to Arizona to become a lecturer and research associate in the zoology department of the University of Arizona, in Tucson. In 1974 he retired to become an emeritus professor at the University of Arizona.

The Kansas Herpetological Society grants an annual scholarship named for Howard K. Gloyd and Edward Harrison Taylor.
