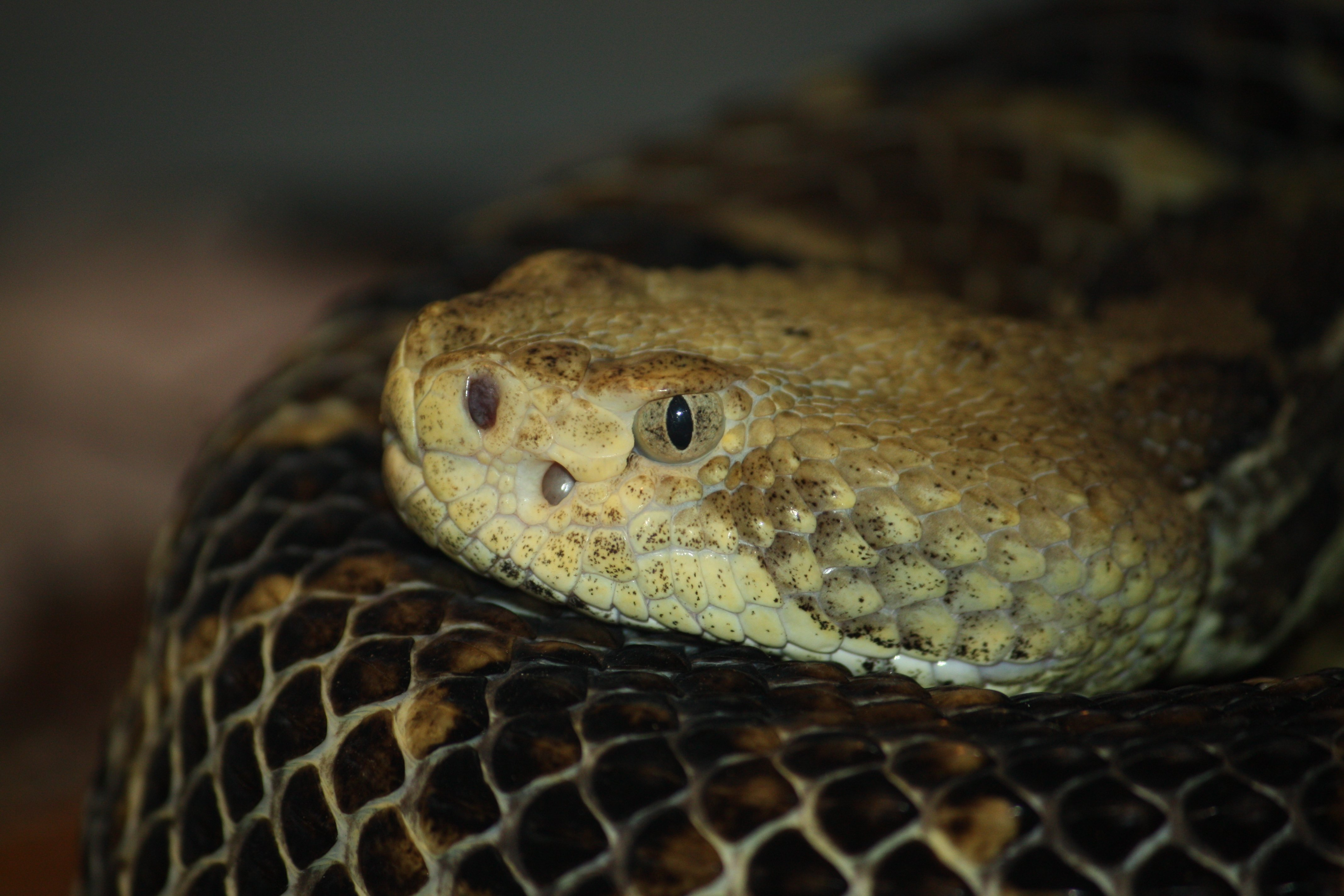
- Timber rattlesnake (Crotalus horridus), showing the characteristic infrared-sensing pit below and between the eye and nostril

Scientific classification
- Kingdom: Animalia
- Phylum: Chordata
- Class: Reptilia
- Order: Squamata
- Suborder: Serpentes
- Family: Viperidae
- Subfamily: Crotalinae; Oppel, 1811

Synonyms
- List: Crotalini Oppel, 1811; Crotales Cuvier, 1817; Crotalidae Gay, 1825; Crotaloidae Fitzinger, 1826; Cophiadae Boie, 1827; Crotaloidei Eichwald, 1831; Crotalina Bonaparte, 1831; Bothrophes Fitzinger, 1843; Crotalinae Cope, 1860; Teleuraspides Cope, 1871; Crotalida Strauch, 1873; Bothrophera Garman, 1884; Cophiinae Cope, 1895; Lachesinae Cope, 1900; Lachesinii Smith, Smith & Sawin, 1977; Agkistrodontinii Hoge & Romano-Hoge, 1981; Agkistrodontini Hoge & Romano-Hoge, 1983

= Pit viper =

Pit viper Temporal range: Early Miocene – present

Subfamily of snakes

The Crotalinae, commonly known as pit vipers, or pit adders, are a subfamily of vipers found in Asia and the Americas, distinguished by the presence of a pair of heat-sensing organs located in a pit between the eye and the nostril on each side of the head. Currently, 23 genera and 155 species are recognized, and like all other vipers, they are venomous. These are also the only viperids found in the Americas. The groups of snakes represented here include rattlesnakes, lanceheads, and Asian pit vipers. The type genus for this subfamily is Crotalus, of which the type species is the timber rattlesnake, C. horridus.

These snakes range in size from the diminutive hump-nosed viper (Hypnale hypnale), which grows to a typical total length (including tail) of only 30–45 cm (12–18 in); to the bushmaster (Lachesis muta), a species known to reach a maximum total length of 3.65 m (12.0 ft) in length.

This viper subfamily is unique in that all member species share a common characteristic – a deep pit, or fossa, in the loreal area between the eye and the nostril on either side of the head. These loreal pits are the external openings to a pair of extremely sensitive infrared-detecting organs, which in effect give the snakes a "sixth sense" to help them find and perhaps even judge the size of the small, warm-blooded prey on which they feed.

Among vipers, these snakes are also unique in that they have a specialized muscle, called the muscularis pterigoidius glandulae, between the venom gland and the head of the ectopterygoid. Contraction of this muscle, together with that of the muscularis compressor glandulae, forces venom out of the gland.

== Evolution ==
The earliest known fossil pit viper remains are from the Early Miocene of Nebraska. As pit vipers are thought to have had an Asian origin before eventually colonizing the Americas, this suggests that they must have originated and diversified even earlier. During the Late Miocene, they reached as far west as eastern Europe, where they are no longer found; it is thought that they did not expand further into Europe.

== Geographic range ==
The subfamily Crotalinae is found from Central Asia eastward and southward to Japan, China, Indonesia, peninsular India, Nepal, Bangladesh and Sri Lanka. In the Americas, they range from southern Canada southward to Central America to southern South America.

== Habitat ==
Crotalines are a versatile subfamily, with members found in habitats ranging from parched desert (e.g., the sidewinder, Crotalus cerastes) to rainforests (e.g., the bushmaster, Lachesis muta). They may be either arboreal or terrestrial, and at least one species (the cottonmouth, Agkistrodon piscivorus) is semiaquatic. The altitude record is held jointly by Crotalus triseriatus in Mexico and Gloydius strauchi in China, both of which have been found above the treeline at over 4,000 m above sea level.

== Behavior ==
Although a few species of crotalines are highly active by day, such as Trimeresurus trigonocephalus, a bright green pit viper endemic to Sri Lanka, most are nocturnal, preferring to avoid high daytime temperatures and to hunt when their favored prey are also active. The snakes' heat-sensitive pits are also thought to aid in locating cooler areas in which to rest.

As ambush predators, crotalines typically wait patiently somewhere for unsuspecting prey to wander by. At least one species, the arboreal Gloydius shedaoensis of China, is known to select a specific ambush site and return to it every year in time for the spring migration of birds. Studies have indicated these snakes learn to improve their strike accuracy over time.

Many temperate species of pit vipers (e.g. most rattlesnakes) congregate in sheltered areas or "dens" to overwinter (brumate, see hibernation), the snakes benefiting from the combined heat. In cool temperatures and while pregnant, pit vipers also bask on sunny ledges. Some species do not mass together in this way, for example the copperhead, Agkistrodon contortrix, or the Mojave rattlesnake, Crotalus scutulatus.

Like most snakes, crotalines keep to themselves and strike only if cornered or threatened. Smaller snakes are less likely to stand their ground than larger specimens. Pollution and the destruction of rainforests have caused many pit viper populations to decline. Humans also threaten pit vipers, as many are hunted for their skins or killed by cars when they wander onto roads.

== Reproduction ==
With few exceptions, crotalines are ovoviviparous, meaning that the embryos develop within eggs that remain inside the mother's body until the offspring are ready to hatch, when the hatchlings emerge as functionally free-living young. In such species, the eggshells are reduced to soft membranes that the young shed, either within the reproductive tract, or immediately after emerging.

Among the oviparous (egg-laying) pit vipers are Lachesis, Calloselasma, and some Trimeresurus species. All egg-laying crotalines are believed to guard their eggs.

Brood sizes range from two for very small species, to as many as 86 for the fer-de-lance, Bothrops atrox, which is among the most prolific of all live-bearing snakes.

Many young crotalines have brightly coloured tails that contrast dramatically with the rest of their bodies. These tails are known to be used by a number of species in a behavior known as caudal luring; the young snakes make worm-like movements with their tails to lure unsuspecting prey within striking distance.

== Taxonomy ==
In the past, the pit vipers were usually classed as a separate family: the Crotalidae. Today, however, the monophyly of the viperines and the crotalines as a whole is undisputed, which is why they are treated here as a subfamily of the Viperidae.

== Genera ==
Genus	Taxon author	Species	Common name	Geographic range (Note: McDiarmid RW, Campbell JA, Touré T. 1999. Snake Species of the World: A Taxonomic and Geographic Reference, vol. 1. Herpetologists' League. 511 pp. ISBN 1-893777-00-6 (series). ISBN 1-893777-01-4 (volume).)
Agkistrodon	Palisot de Beauvois, 1799	6	Moccasins	North America from the northeastern and central USA southward through peninsular Florida and southwestern Texas. In Central America on the Atlantic versant from Tamaulipas and Nuevo León southward to the Yucatán Peninsula, Belize and Guatemala. Along the Pacific coastal plain and lower foothills from Sonora south through Guatemala, El Salvador, Honduras and Nicaragua to northwestern Costa Rica.
Atropoides	Werman, 1992	1	Picado's jumping pit viper	Costa Rica and western Panama
Bothriechis	Peters, 1859	19	Palm-pit vipers	Southern Mexico (southeastern Oaxaca and the northern highlands of Chiapas), through Central America to northern South America (Colombia, western Venezuela, Ecuador and northern Peru
Bothrocophias	Gutberlet & Campbell, 2001	9	Toadheaded pit vipers	Northern South America
Bothrops	Wagler, 1824	48	Lanceheads	Northeastern Mexico (Tamaulipas) southward through Central and South America to Argentina; Saint Lucia and Martinique in the Lesser Antilles; Ilha da Queimada Grande off the coast of Brazil
Calloselasma	Cope, 1860	1	Malayan pit viper	Southeast Asia from Thailand to northern Malaysia and Java, Indonesia
Cerrophidion	Campbell & Lamar, 1992	5	Montane pit vipers	Southern Mexico (highlands of Guerrero and southeastern Oaxaca), southward through the highlands of Central America (Guatemala, El Salvador, Honduras, northern Nicaragua, Costa Rica) to western Panama
Craspedocephalus	Kuhl & van Hasselt, 1822	15	Pit viper	India to Thailand to northern Malaysia and Indonesia
Crotalus^{T}	Linnaeus, 1758	51	Rattlesnakes	The Americas, from southern Canada to northern Argentina
Deinagkistrodon	Gloyd, 1979	1	Hundred-pace pit viper	Southeast Asia
Garthius	Malhotra & Thorpe, 2004	1	Mount Kinabalu pit viper, Chasen's mountain pit viper	Borneo
Gloydius	Hoge & Romano-Hoge, 1981	22	Asian moccasins	Russia, east of the Ural Mountains through Siberia, Iran, the Himalayas from Pakistan, India, Nepal and China, Korea, Japan and the Ryukyu Islands
Hypnale	Fitzinger, 1843	3	Hump-nosed pit vipers	Sri Lanka and India
Lachesis	Daudin, 1803	4	Bushmasters	Central and South America
Metlapilcoatlus	Campbell, Frost, & Castoe, 2019	6	Jumping pit vipers	The mountains of eastern Mexico southeastward on the Atlantic versant and lowlands though Central America to central Panama. On the Pacific versant, they occur in isolated populations in east-central and southern Mexico, Guatemala, El Salvador, Costa Rica, and Panama.
Mixcoatlus	Jadin, H.M.Smith & Campbell, 2011	3	Mexican pit vipers	Mexico
Ophryacus	Cope, 1887	3	Mexican horned pit vipers	Mexico
Ovophis	Burger, 1981	8	Mountain pit vipers	Nepal and Seven Sisters (Assam) of India eastward through Myanmar, Cambodia, Thailand, Laos, Vietnam, West Malaysia, Taiwan, Japan (Okinawa) and Indonesia (Sumatra)
Porthidium	Cope, 1871	9	Hognose pit vipers	Mexico (Colima, Oaxaca and Chiapas on the Pacific side, the Yucatán Peninsula on the Atlantic side) southward through Central America to northern South America (Ecuador in the Pacific lowlands, northern Venezuela in the Atlantic lowlands)
Protobothrops	Hoge & Romano-Hoge, 1983	14	Pit vipers	Asia
Sistrurus	Garman, 1883	3	Ground rattlesnakes	Southeastern Canada, eastern, central and northwestern USA, isolated populations in northern and central Mexico
Trimeresurus	Lacépède, 1804	43	Asian lanceheads	Southeast Asia from India to southern China and Japan, and the Malay Archipelago to Timor
Tropidolaemus	Wagler, 1830	5	Temple vipers	Southern India and Southeast Asia

*) Not including the nominate subspecies.
^{T}) Type genus.

== See also ==
- List of crotaline species and subspecies
