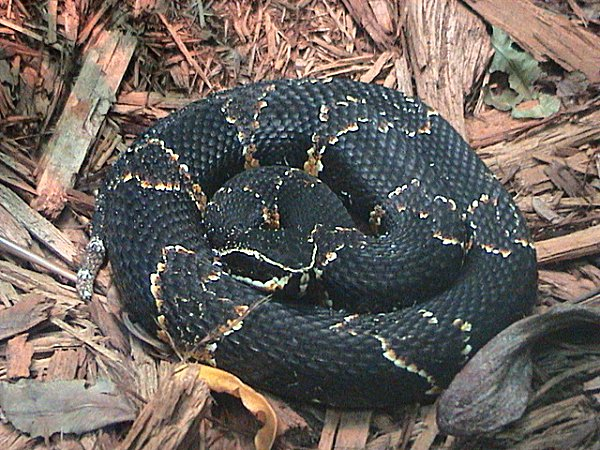

Conservation status
- Least Concern (IUCN 3.1)

Scientific classification
- Kingdom: Animalia
- Phylum: Chordata
- Class: Reptilia
- Order: Squamata
- Suborder: Serpentes
- Family: Viperidae
- Genus: Agkistrodon
- Species: A. taylori

Binomial name
- Agkistrodon taylori Burger & Robertson, 1951

Synonyms
- Agkistrodon bilineatus [In part] Taylor, 1940; Agkistrodon bilineatus taylori (nomen nudum) Smith & Taylor, 1950; Agkistrodon bilineatus taylori Burger & Robertson, 1951; Agkistrodon taylori Parkinson, et al. 2000

= Agkistrodon taylori =

Species of snake

Agkistrodon taylori is a species of venomous snake, a pitviper (Crotalinae) found only in northeastern Mexico. The standardized names are Taylor's cantil (English) and Metapil (Spanish), although it is sometimes called the ornate cantil as well as several other colloquial names. It was named in honor of American herpetologist Edward Harrison Taylor.

It is a stout, medium sized snake, averaging 64–90 cm. in length. Taylor's cantils have prominent light and dark stripes on the head, with a pattern of black and gray-brown bands on the body, accented with white, yellow, and orange. They are sexually dimorphic, with males being significantly darker than females. Some older individuals, particularly males, may grow darker, nearly black with age. It is a viviparous species, with typical litters of 3 to 10 live young. Taylor's cantils are uncommon to rare snakes in the wild and listed as a threatened species in Mexico. It occurs in a variety of habitats on the Gulf Coastal Plain and lower foothills of the Sierra Madre Oriental, including thorn scrub, tropical deciduous forest, and grasslands, sometimes said to prefer ecotones between scrubland and forest in the vicinity of rocky limestone outcroppings. Although not overtly aggressive, it is known to be very defensive with a volatile temper and may be quick to strike when approached, threatened, or restrained. No case reports of human envenomations have been published. Its venom is believed to be similar to its close relative, the cantil Agkistrodon bilineatus, and potentially fatal.

== Etymology ==
The original description states that the specific, or trivial name, was "Named for Dr. Edward H. Taylor in recognition of his many contributions to our knowledge of the Mexican herpetofauna." Indeed, Taylor's extensive publications on Mexico's amphibians and reptiles, culminating with the "Herpetology of Mexico", published in collaboration with his student Hobart M. Smith, is the foundation of modern Mexican herpetology. Taylor's work on Mexico alone would have secured him a prominent reputation in the field of herpetology. However, Taylor made equally important contributions to the study of Philippine land mammals, the herpetofauna of the Philippines, the herpetofauna of the south-central United States, Eumeces (skinks of the world at that time), the herpetofauna of Costa Rica, the herpetofauna of Thailand, and caecilians of the world.

The common name cantil is believed to have its origins in the language of an indigenous people of Chiapas, Mexico, the Tzeltal. The Tzeltal word "kantiil" was given to the snake meaning yellow lips (kan = yellow, tiil = lips). The name is thought to have first entered herpetological literature in the publication of Albert Günther's Reptilia and Batrachia in Biologia Centrali-Americana, and later popularized in the writings of Raymond L. Ditmars. However, later authors questioned that attribution, as the Tzeltal are highland people and unlikely to have had significant contact with the species. Alternatively, "can" or "canti" meaning "viper", and "nil" meaning snake, are used in a more widespread Mayan language that might be the origin of the name cantil.

== Taxonomy and phylogenetics ==
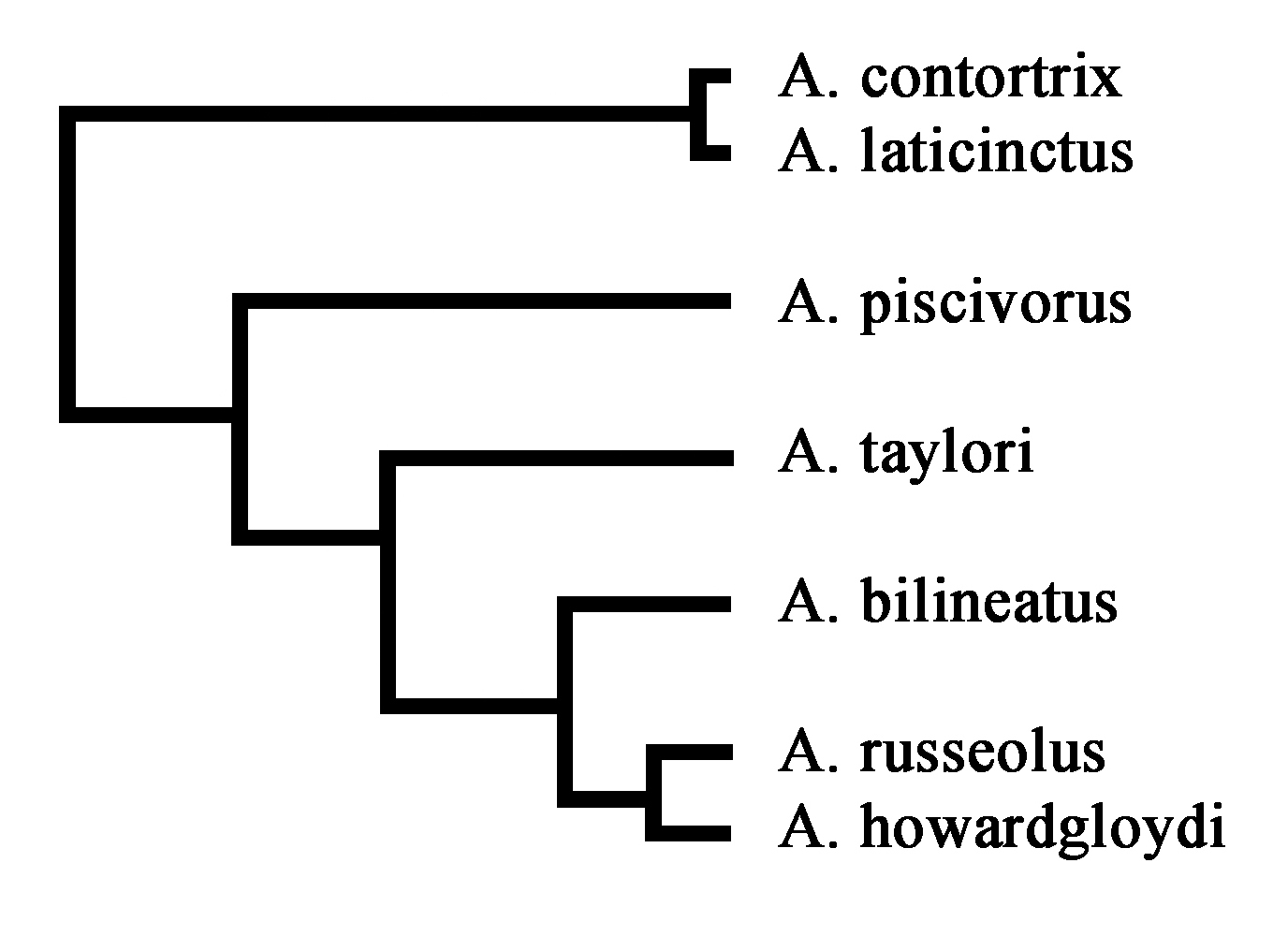
Phylogenetic relationships of Agkistrodon based on Parkinson et al. (2000), modified with updated taxonomy

Recent molecular studies have produced strong evidence indicating that pitvipers made a single invasion into the New World, presumably via the Bering Land Bridge in the early Tertiary or late Cretaceous, with a subsequent divergence resulting in a northern temperate group (including Agkistrodon, Crotalus, and Sistrurus) and a Neotropical group. Of the Old World pitvipers, Gloydius appears to be phylogenetically close to the New World pitvipers, but the exact relationship between Old World and New World pit vipers is not fully resolved at this time. The molecular evidence indicates the genus Agkistrodon is a monophyletic group, meaning they all share a common ancestor, and suggest that copperheads, (Agkistrodon contortrix) are the most basal (ancestral) living lineage of the genus, with the cottonmouths (Agkistrodon piscivorus) basal to Taylor's cantil (A. taylori), and A. taylori basal to the remaining cantils of Latin America.

The taxonomic history of Taylor's cantil (Agkistrodon taylori) is relatively simple and straight forward compared to many species.

Agkistrodon bilineatus, In part: Edward H. Taylor collected what was to become the holotype of A. taylori, on June 9, 1938, "crawling on the highway pavement about dark" very near the Tamaulipas, Nuevo Leon state line. Using the name Agkistrodon bilineatus, he published a detailed description of the specimen including color, pattern and scale data, noting some differences compared with the head of a specimen from Michoacán. Agkistrodon bilineatus taylori, Nomen nudum: Taylor and Hobart Smith published the name in a checklist of type localities of Mexican herpetofauna. However, the list was published before the subspecies formal description, thus making the name a nomen nudum, a technical term for a scientific name that is invalid because it is not associated with any published description, definition, or holotype of a taxon. Taylor and Smith knew of the impending description, published about 19 months after their checklist. The authors acknowledged "Our attention was first called to this interesting situation by Dr. Edward H. Taylor.....to whom we are indebted for permission to study it", and Hobart Smith for his "advice and assistance". Agkistrodon bilineatus taylori: Formally described as subspecies in 1951, the holotype is in the collection of the University of Illinois Museum of Natural History (UIMNH 10002). It has been transferred between collections a number of times and identified as: EHT-HMS 5514 (Edward H. Taylor and Hobart M. Smith collection); EHT 5514 (Edward H. Taylor collection); and INHS 5514 (Illinois Natural History Survey). It is a young male, 383 mm. snout-vent length, and 82 mm. tail length (465 mm. total length). A paratype was also designated, Chicago Natural History Museum 28794, an adult male from "no more than a few mile from the type locality". For the remainder of the 20th century the taxonomic status remained unchanged. Agkistrodon taylori: Taylor's cantil was elevated to species status in research published in 2000, based on a combination of mitochondrial DNA sequences, its geographic isolation (allopatry), unique aspects of head and body colour pattern, and sexual dichromatism (sexual dimorphism) in adults. Subsequent taxonomic reviews and species accounts supported the recognition of A. taylori as a specie.

== Description ==
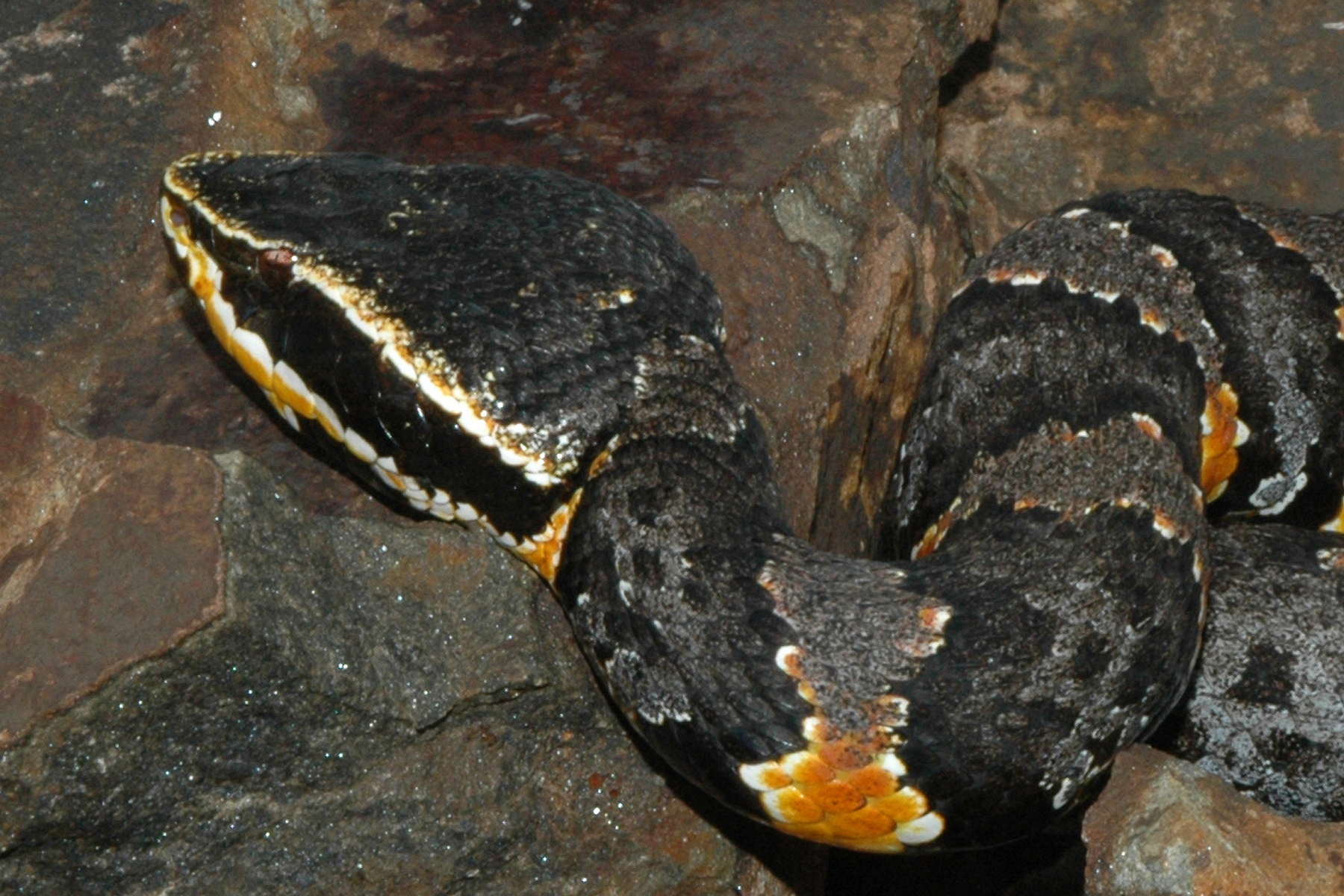
A female Taylor's Cantil photographed in the field in southern Tamaulipas, Mexico among the rocks in its natural habitat (11 September 2007)

Size: Taylor's cantils, and Agkistrodon in general, are relatively stout, heavy bodied snakes. Adults average 64–90 cm (25 1/4–35 3/8 in) with no significant difference between males and females in total length. The tails of adult A. taylori are proportionately shorter than other species of cantils, 16–19% of the total length in males, and 13–18% in females. The largest confirmed size was a male, 96 cm (37 3/4 in) in total length. One herpetologist found a specimen dead on a highway in 1974 that he estimated to be ca. 4.5 feet (1.37 m.) long, however this record is not verifiable. Scutellation: Nine large crown plates (two internasals, two prefrontals, one frontal, two supraoculars, two parietals) are characteristic of all members of the genus Agkistrodon, although on A. taylori some slight aberrations and fragmentations of these plates are typical, particularly the posterior end of the parietals which tend to be divided into small scales. A loreal scale is present. Supralabial are normally eight (occasionally seven or nine). Infralabials are normally 10 or 11 (occasionally 9 or 12). The dorsal scales are keeled with paired apical pits, although the lowest two lateral rows may be smooth. Dorsal scale rows are 25 or 23 on the anterior part of the body, 23 at midbody (rarely 21), and 19 to 21 near the tail. Ventral scales on the body range from 127 to 138. Subcaudals in males range from 45 to 56 (27 to 46 undivided), and in females 40 to 47 (19 to 35 undivided). The anal plate is undivided and the tip of the tail terminates in a small, downturned, spine-like scale.

Taylor's cantil can be distinguished from other members of the genus Agkistrodon by the presence of a loreal scale (loreal scale absent in A. piscivorus and A. conanti), two bold and distinctive white or yellowish stripes on each side of the face (absent in A. contortrix and A. laticinctus), and a lower number of subcaudals: 45 to 56 in males, 40 to 47 in females (55 to 71 in male, 46 to 67 in female A. bilineatus, A. howardgloydi, and A. russeolus). Additionally, A. taylori is the only species of cantil in which the lower white or yellow stripes on the face fills the supralabial scales to the lower margin of the scale, to the mouth line (lower margin of supralabial scales have a narrow dark stripe or dark pigment in A. bilineatus, A. howardgloydi, and A. russeolus). Agkistrodon taylori is also the only species in the genus to exhibit an obvious sexual dimorphism.

== Distribution ==
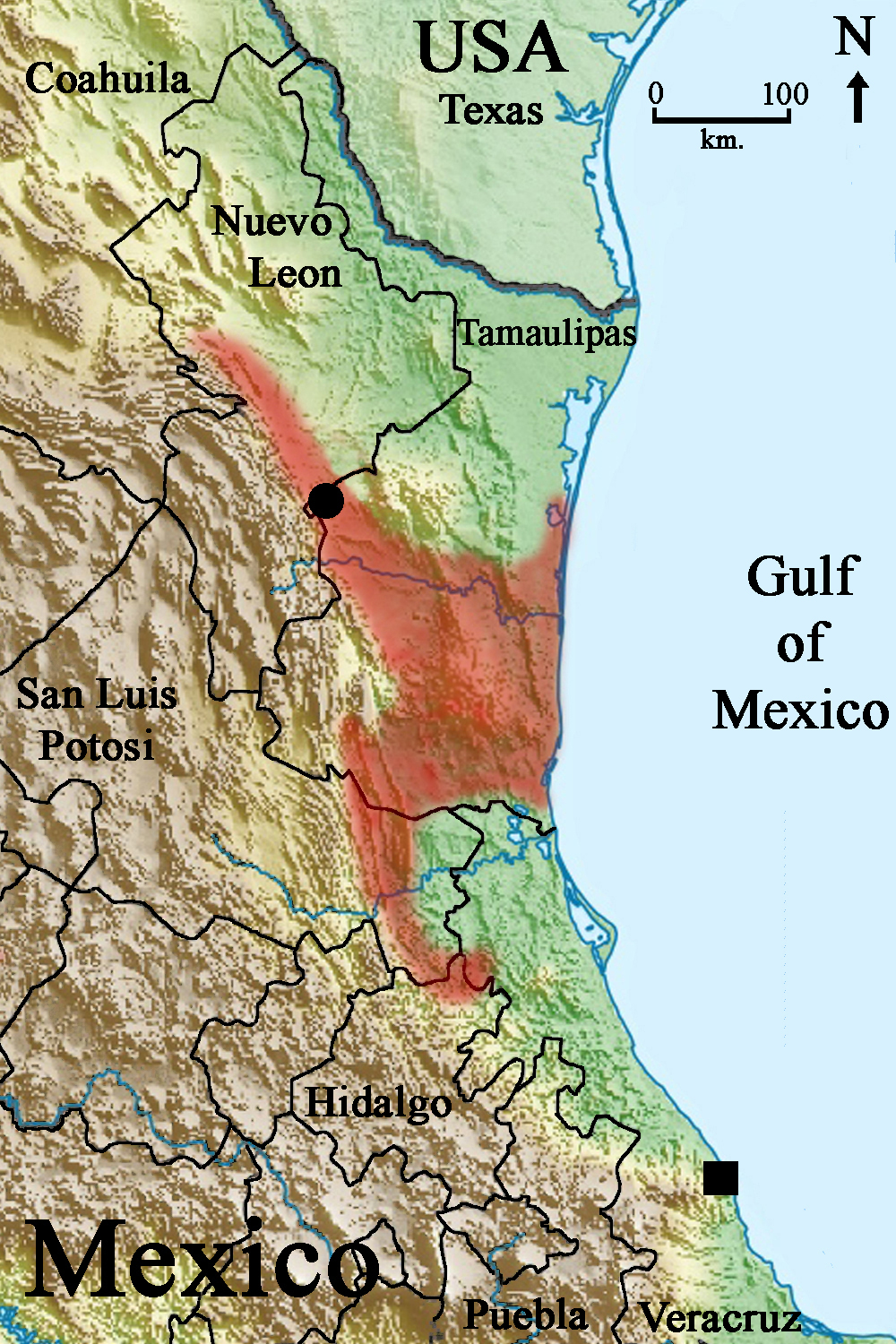
Distribution of Agkistrodon taylori: circle = type locality of A. taylori; square = type locality of A. bilineatus lemosespinali

Agkistrodon taylori is endemic to Mexico. It occurs primarily in southern Tamaulipas, with one record near the coast as far north as Carboneras. Elevations typically range from near sea level to about 500 m., with a maximum elevation of 919 m. in San Luis Potosi. The type locality is "21 km north of Villagrán, Tamaulipas, Mexico". It has been speculated that A. taylori occurs in the Sierra de San Carlos, based on the local inhabitants identifying photographs, however no confirmed records from the mountain range are available.

There are also a few of scattered records from lower elevations on the eastern slopes and canyons of the Sierra Madre Oriental. These include a number of records from Nuevo Leon as far north as Monterrey, south to the vicinity of El Naranjo, San Luis Potosi, Atlapexco and Huejutla de Reyes, Hidalgo, and near Tantoyuca, Veracruz. A number of photographic records been reported on the social network iNaturalist, filling gaps in the distribution of previously published records, particularly in Nuevo Leon, San Luis Potosi, and Veracruz.

A southernmost record represents a single specimen from near Palma Sola, Veracruz, which was first described as a subspecies, Agkistrodon bilineatus lemosespinali, however more recent accounts considered the defining characters of A. b. lemosespinali fell within the normal range of A. taylor. And yet another more detailed study concluded Agkistrodon bilineatus lemosespinali appeared to be more closely related to, if not the same as, Agkistrodon bilineatus.

== Ecology and natural history ==
The fact that A. taylori was not described until 1951 and known only from two specimens at that time is some indication of its rarity. Paul S. Martin's work in Tamaulipas from 1948 to1953 encompassed 12 collectors and 14 months of fieldwork yielding only three specimens, and he noted interviews with two lifelong resident farmers that indicated they had seen "only one other snake of this type". Likewise, a six year field survey in the 1970s noted "A few woodcutters we queried had encountered A. b. taylori and they concurred that it is rare in the area." Several studies have commented on the scarcity of museum specimens available for research, including a landmark 1990 monographic review of the genus Agkistrodon which identified only 19 specimens, a 2007 study on Hidalgo, San Luis Potosi, and Veracruz populations identifying only one from each state, and a 2013 study reported only 27 specimens from Tamaulipas.

As a rare and threatened species, Patrick Burchfield of the Gladys Porter Zoo in Brownsville, Texas, focused special attention on Taylor's cantil for conservation efforts and conducted field surveys 1974-1979 that provided much of what is known about the natural history of the species. Taylor's cantil was found to be most active in the months of October to March, which is the cool and rainy season in the region. It is predominantly corpuscular and nocturnal, but is occasionally known to be active on rainy or overcast days.

Several authors have commented on the temperamental nature of A. taylori. If blocked from a clear retreat, cornered, harassed, restrained, or handled it may be quick to strike. "When provoked, specimens of taylori lash their tails from front to back and side to side in typical cantil fashion, meanwhile striking out repeatedly. Sometimes one will move so violently that it actually will leave the ground."

Zoos have reported on the longevity of captive specimens including a male that lived 15 years, 7 months, and 19 days. Another individual that arrived at a zoo as an adult lived 17 years and 5 months and was estimated to be ca. 19 years 11 months at the time it died.

=== Habitat ===
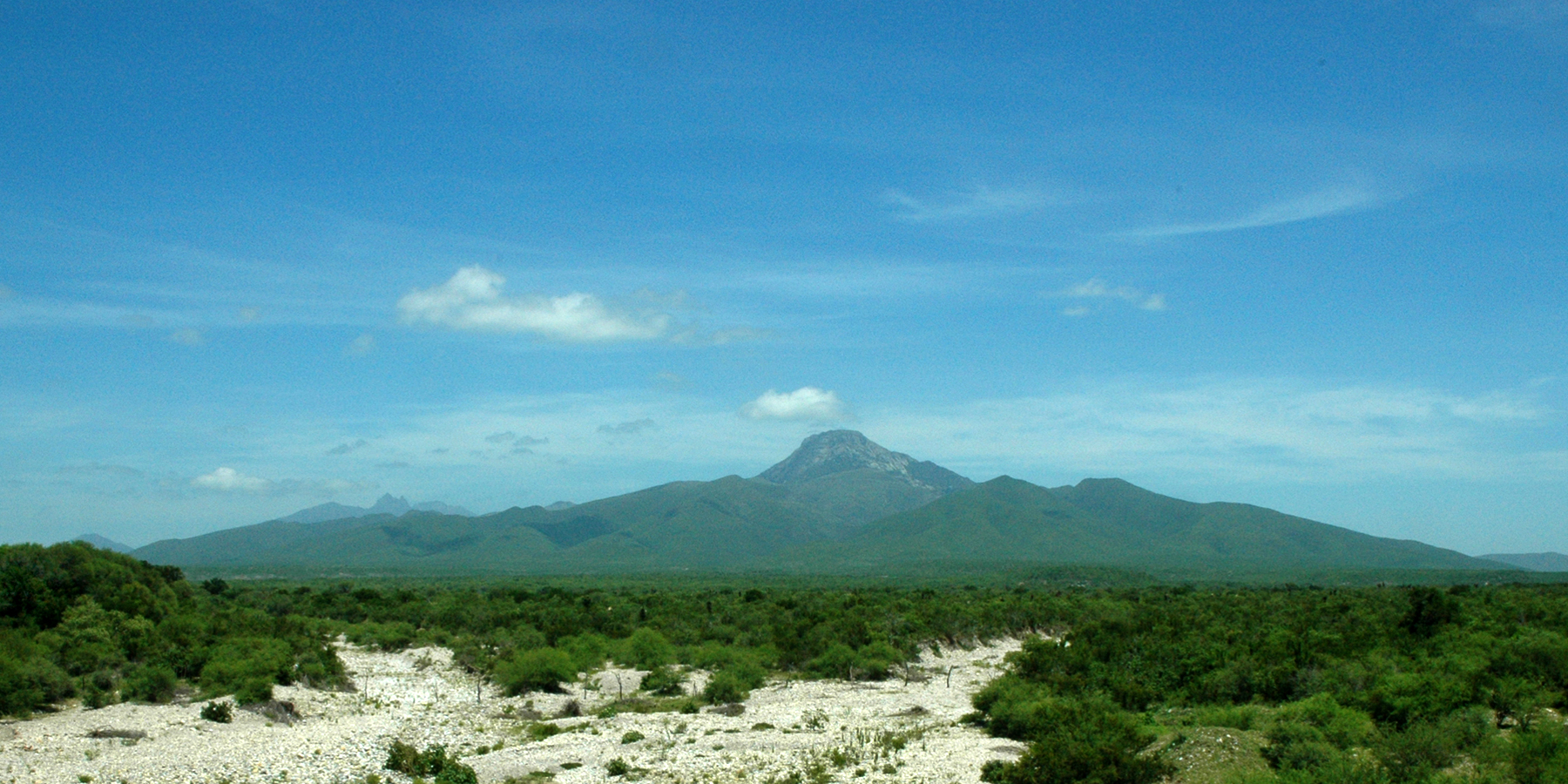
Tamaulipan thorn scrub, about 68 km. east-southeast of the type locality, with the Sierra de San Carlos in the background (14 July 2007)

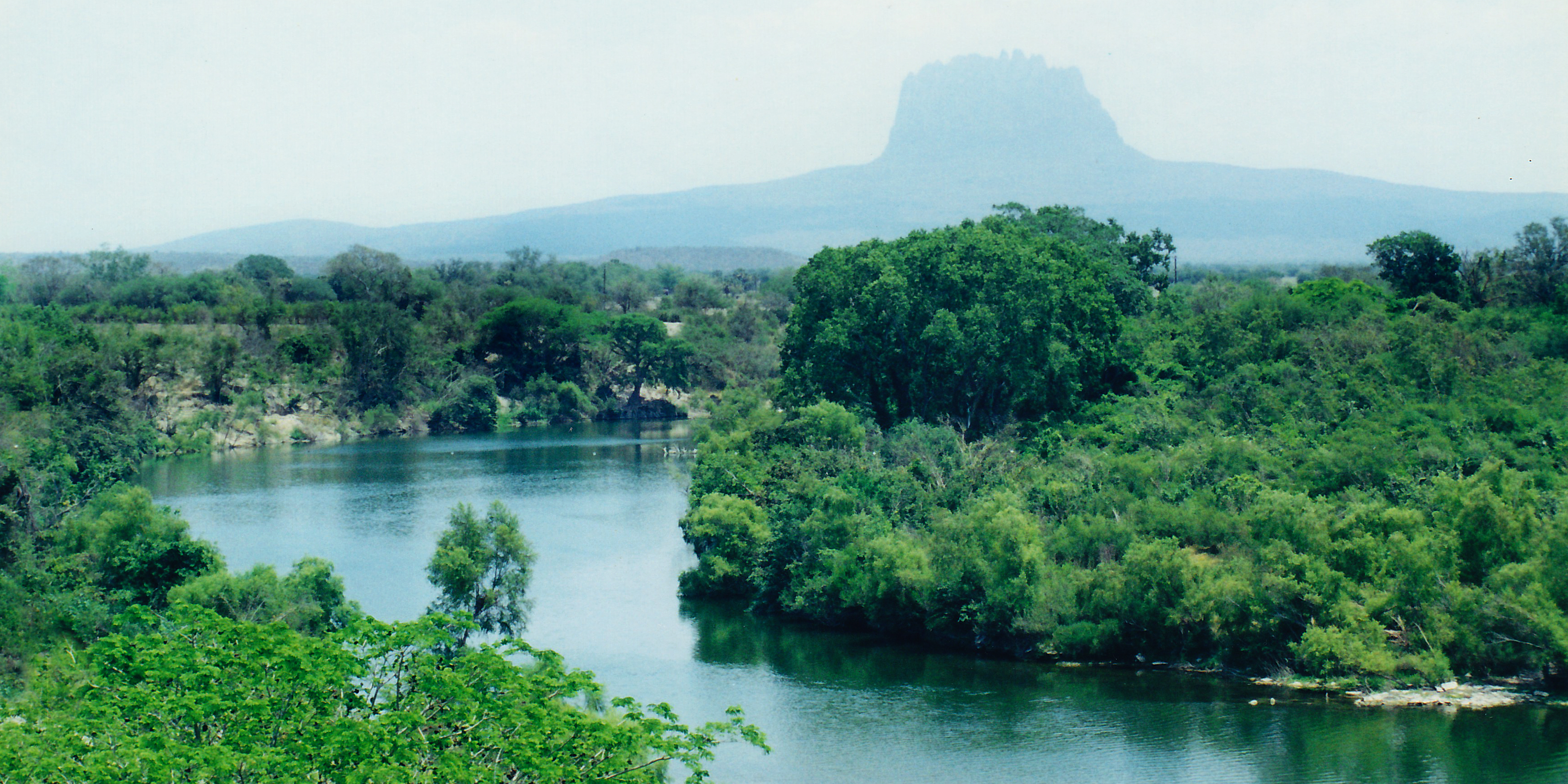
Tropical scrubland and tropical deciduous forest with the Rio Guayalejo and Cerro del Bernal in the Municipality of Gonzlaez, Tamaulipas, Mexico (17 April 2001)

Agkistrodon taylori is found in a variety of habitats, including mesquite-grassland, thorn forest, and tropical deciduous forest. The Tropic of Cancer transects the distribution of A. taylori, where the temperate Tamaulipan mezquital eco region in the north meets the tropical Veracruz moist forests in the south. Gulf coastal grasslands and scrublands near sea level occur in the east and the foot hills and canyons of the Sierra Madre Oriental occur in the west of its range.

The type locality was described as a "semi-arid area covered with desert shrub vegetation". In western areas of the range Paul S. Martin reported on three specimens removed from a "den" in palm forest north of Chamal (Adolfo López Mateos), Tamaulipas. and it has been found in the riparian zones at the bottom of canyons of the eastern sloops Sierra Madre Oriental (393 meters elevation). In one occurrence, Agkistrodon taylori was found in hardwood forest on lower mountain sloops, at ca. 3000 feet (914 m. maximum confirmed elevation) west of El Naranjo, San Luis Potosi, in a vegetation zone described by Paul S. Martin as tropical semi-evergreen forest It has been reported from disturbed, secondary growth, in areas of tropical deciduous forest.

Field surveys conducted in the 1970s noted that collecting in riparian zones failed to yield specimens, indicating that Taylor's cantil is not closely associated with wetlands. The favored habitat was found to be open canopied woodlands with limestone outcrops and rock-strewn hillsides. The preferred habitat was in areas of an ecotone between arid tropical thorn scrub and tropical semi-deciduous forest, which included trees such as Texas ebony (Pithecellobium flexicaule [= Ebenopsis ebano]) and strangler fig (Ficus sp.). Large terrestrial bromeliads, "wild pineapples" (Bromelia sp.), armed with sharp spines, grow in the understory, in some areas forming dense, impenetrable thickets providing shelter for the snakes. Recent decades have seen a significant increase in agriculture and development in these areas of Tamaulipas, significantly reducing wildlife habitat.

=== Diet ===
Information on the diet of wild Taylor's cantils is minimal. The information that is available suggest A. taylori is a diet generalist, similar to other species in the genus. One study found fecal analysis of recently collected snakes contained grasshopper remains and hair from unidentified mammals. Two individuals manually palpated to regurgitate yielded a Mexican pocket mouse (Liomys irroratus = Heteromys irroratus) and a white-footed mouse (Peromyscus leucopus).

Juveniles have been observed using the yellowish tips of their tails as a lure to attract prey, a behavior known as caudal luring and recorded in several species of snakes. "The tail was elevated in a vertical position, approximately four cm (1.5 in) above the snake's body, and the tail tip was being wriggled."

In captivity adults have accepted lab mice, house mice, hamsters, and brown rats, neonates have been fed fish, small frogs, and baby pink mice, and one case of cannibalism has been reported when an adult female consumed an adult male cage mate.

=== Reproduction ===
Like all members of the genus, Agkistrodon taylori is viviparous. Most of what is known about the reproduction of A. taylori comes from captive specimens in zoos. Like many species of snakes, males have been observed to engage in a ritualized "combat dance" in captivity on several occasions. This behavior could be compared to arm wrestling. Typically two males, in the vicinity of a female, will intertwine their bodies and attempt to raise their heads higher than their opponent's, while trying push down or pin the other snake's head to the ground. Normally the loser retreats unharmed and the winner mates with the female. However in at least one case in captivity, a male Taylor's cantil was unable to escape its opponent in confinement, and after 12 days was ultimately killed by its cage mate. "Post-mortem revealed a bite puncture wound in the heart area with severe hemorrhaging in the tissue"

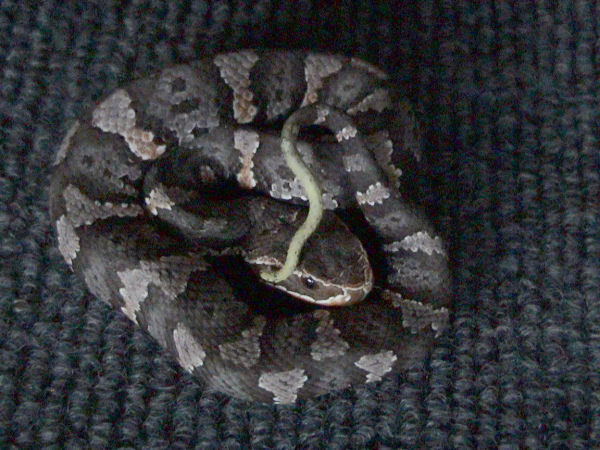
A juvenile Taylor's cantil with lighter colors and a yellow tail

Courtship and copulation have been observed in captivity mostly from November to February (rarely as early as mid September). If these months reflect activities in the wild, mating occurs in the October to March cool and wet season. Copulation is known to last an hour and a half to three hours. Births have been reported from early May to July,May to September,and June to October. Litters have ranged from three to eleven young (average 8), 17.2 – 27 cm. (average 23.7 cm.) in total length, and average 12.1 grams (16 g. maximum) in weight.

Neonates are patterned like adults, including characters of sexual dimorphism, but much lighter in color (comparable to Agkistrodon piscivorus). The colors of the young have been described as less intense than adults with various shades of darker and lighter grays and creamy yellow,and bright cream, yellow, or salmon colored.

The Bronx Zoo reported an unusual incidence of twinning in Taylor's cantil, when two snakes were observed in one egg sac membrane at birth. Although the twins were proportionate in size to the rest of the clutch with no apparent deformities, of eight young, the twins were significantly smaller than their siblings and one did not survive long after birth. It is unknown if they were identical or fraternal.

== Conservation status ==
The IUCN Red List of Threatened Species ranked Agkistrodon taylori as a species of least concern in 2007. It has, however, been listed as a threatened species for decades by the Mexican Federal Government and is protected by Mexican law. No comprehensive studies have been made of A. taylori populations in the wild however, assessments of its conservation status elicit statements such as "this species faces a bleak future due to habitat destruction for agriculture" and "urgent measures may be required to ensure continued existence of the biogeographically important and spectacularly coloured Taylor's cantil." A 2013 taxonomic reevaluation and conservation assessment of cantils was subtitled ":a race against time". On recent conservation evaluations using the Environmental Vulnerability Score (EVS) [low, 3–9; medium, 10–13; high, 14–20], Agkistrodon taylori was rated 17, a species of high vulnerability.

== Colloquialisms and folklore ==
Paul S. Martin wrote that the name "cantil" was unknown in the Gómez Farías region of southwest Tamaulipas and that "metapil" was occasionally used by residents, and might refer to A. taylori. In contrast, Pat Burchfield of the Gladys Porter Zoo wrote that he had never heard that name used in the eastern and coastal regions of Tamaulipas and the farmers and ranchers there referred to a freshwater fish as metapil, however the name "navaja" was sometimes used for both Boa imperator and A. taylori. Locals described a short, heavy, very aggressive snake that could jump and bite, and sting with its tail which they called "hueson" (big bone) and "cola hueso" (bone tail).

== Captivity ==
Keeping venomous animals as pets is generally discouraged. Additionally, many national, state, and municipal governments regulate the possession and transportation of venomous reptiles, and if not entirely prohibited, the possession and transportation of venomous reptiles and other exotic wildlife often require permits and are subject to restrictions. The illegal collecting of this threatened species for the pet trade has been implicated as one of several conservation threats.

Because of its attractive coloration and relatively small size, A. taylori are occasionally seen in the exotic pet trade, with captive bred individuals sometimes available. The care and requirements are similar to A. contortrix. This species is not for the inexperienced keeper. The venom of A. taylori is significantly stronger than that of A. contortrix and can cause severe tissue damage and potentially death if untreated.

== Gallery ==
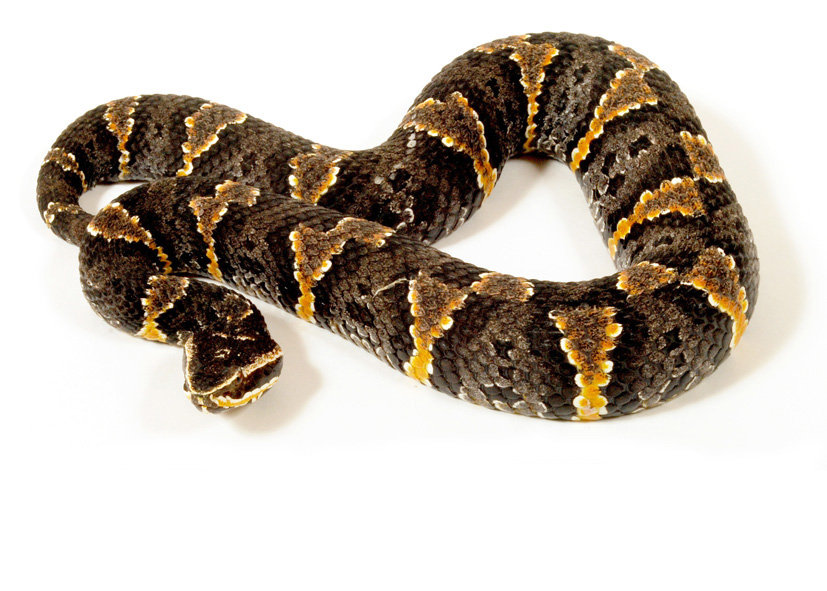
A female Agkistrodon taylori

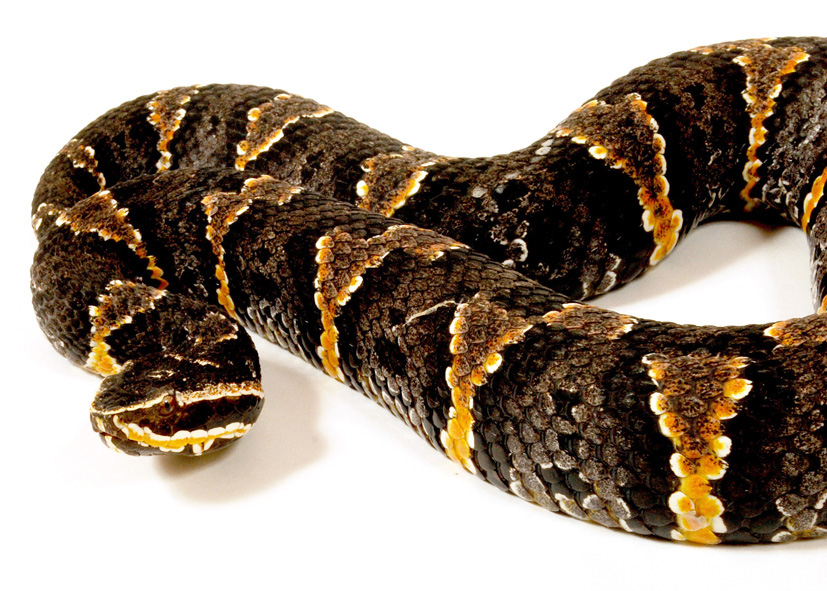
Close up view of a female Agkistrodon taylori

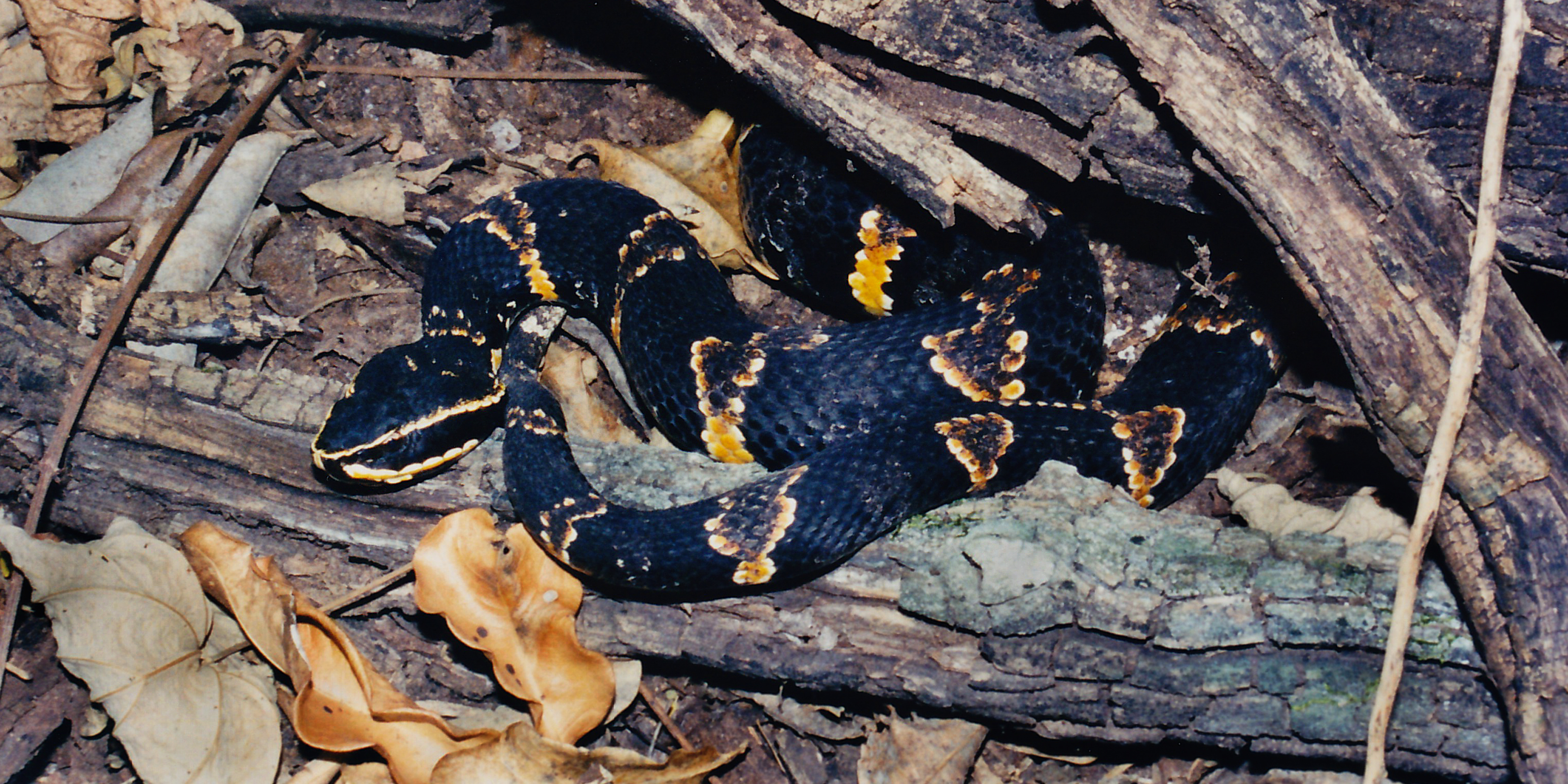
A male Taylor's cantil (Agkistrodon taylori) photographed in the field in southern, Tamaulipas, Mexico (24 October 2004)
