= Castellan (disambiguation) =

A castellan is the constable or official in charge of a castle and its territory.

Castellan may also refer to:

- Castellan (Doctor Who), the character in the Doctor Who TV serial
- Castellan (DC Comics), one of the many fictional alter-egos of villain Carl Draper in DC Comics
- Castellan, Pembrokeshire, a former parish in Wales

== Surname ==
- Antoine-Laurent Castellan (1772–1838), French painter, architect, and engraver
- Carlos Castellan (born 1962), Argentinian tennis player
- Erin Castellan, American contemporary artist
- Jeanne-Anaïs Castellan (1819–1861), French soprano
- Julieta Castellán (born 1972), Argentinian field hockey player
- Osvaldo Castellan (1951–2008), Italian cyclist
- Pierre-Joseph de Castellan (fl. 1748–1785), French Navy officer

== See also ==
- Castile (historical region) whose inhabitants are Castilians
  - Castellano (disambiguation), the native term for the people, culture, and language of Castile
- Castellana (disambiguation)
- Castellane, Taranto, Italy
- Castellania (disambiguation)
- Castellation, the defensive feature on a castle wall
- Castelen, a surname
