= Kasztelan (surname) =

Kasztelan is an occupational Polish-language surname: kasztelan ("castellan") was a type of an official in the Polish–Lithuanian Commonwealth. Notable people with the surname include:

- Adrian Kasztelan (born 1986), Polish footballer
- Antoni Kasztelan (1896–1942) Polish military intelligence officer (among other occupations)
- Krzysztof Kasztelan, Polish former footballer
- Michael Müller-Kasztelan (born 1981), German opera singer
- Zenon Kasztelan (born 1946), Polish footballer

== See also ==
- Castellan (disambiguation)#Surname
