= La Castellana =

La Castellana may refer to:

- La Castellana, Negros Occidental, a municipality in the Philippines
- La Castellana, Caracas, a district in Caracas, Venezuela
- La Castellana (TransMilenio), a transit station in Bogotá, Colombia
- Paseo de la Castellana, a road in Madrid, Spain

== See also ==
- Castellana (disambiguation)
