= Kasztelan =

Kasztelan is Polish for castellan and may refer to:

- Kasztelan of the Polish–Lithuanian Commonwealth
- Kasztelan (surname)
- Kasztelan (beer)
- Kasztelan (card game), a once-popular Polish card game
