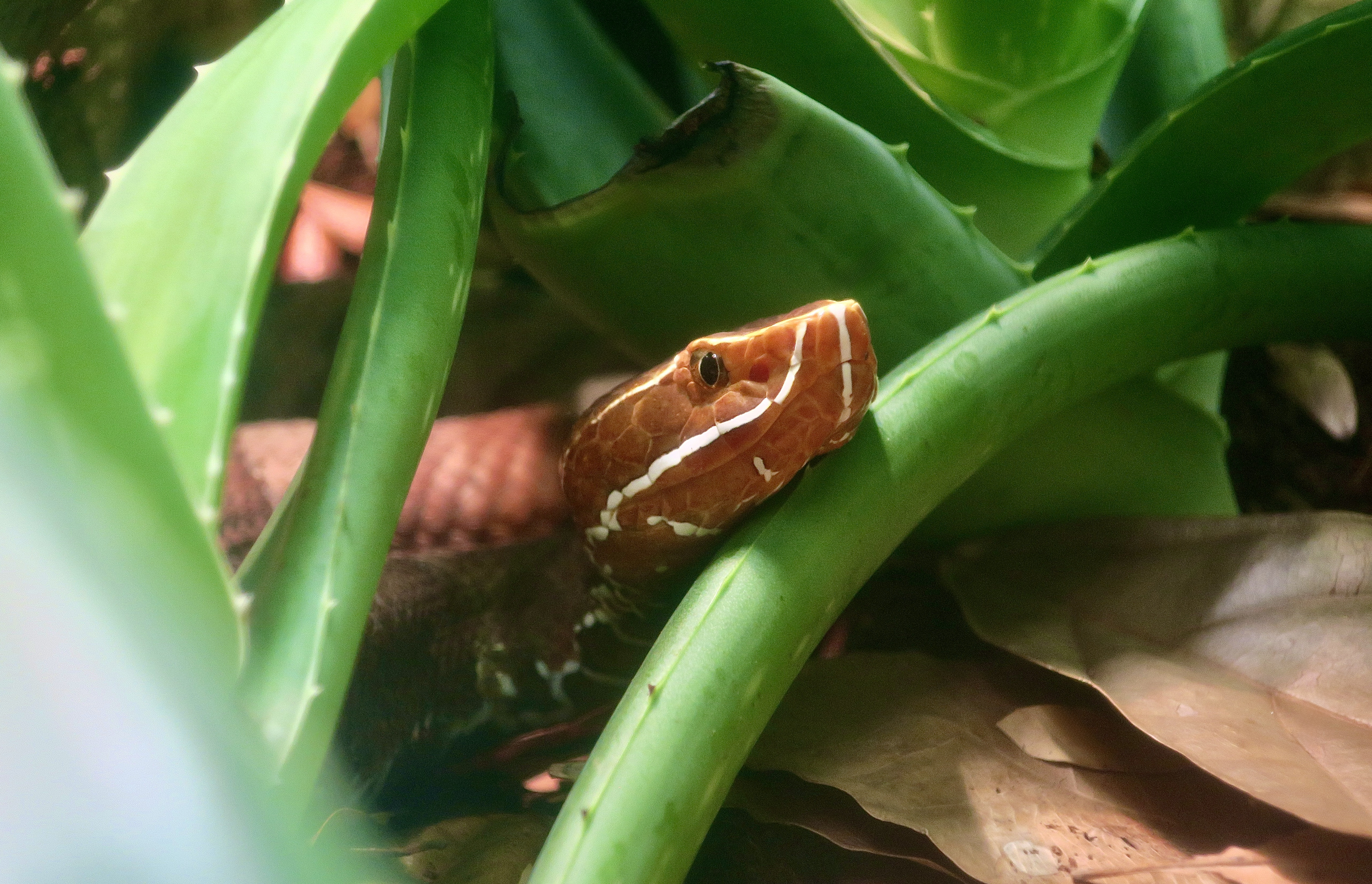

Scientific classification
- Kingdom: Animalia
- Phylum: Chordata
- Class: Reptilia
- Order: Squamata
- Suborder: Serpentes
- Family: Viperidae
- Genus: Agkistrodon
- Species: A. howardgloydi

Binomial name
- Agkistrodon howardgloydi Conant, 1984

Synonyms
- Agkistrodon bilineatus howardgloydi Conant, 1984; Agkistrodon howardgloydi — Porras et al., 2013

= Agkistrodon howardgloydi =

Species of snake

Agkistrodon howardgloydi is a species of venomous snake, a pit viper in the subfamily Crotalinae of the family Viperidae. The species is endemic to Central America. It is most commonly called castellana, but it has also been called the southern cantil, Gloyd's moccasin, and a number of other colloquial names. It is a rare species with a relatively small geographic distribution in the tropical dry forest on the Pacific coast of Honduras, Nicaragua, and extreme northwest Costa Rica. A. howardgloydi is a stout, medium-sized snake with a maximum total length (including tail) of 96 cm (38 in). It is a viviparous species, with females giving birth in the rainy season from May to August. No clinical reports on envenomation had been published (as of 1999), but laboratory tests and analysis indicate the venom is highly toxic and similar to its close relative Agkistrodon bilineatus, and potentially lethal.

== Etymology ==
Roger Conant's original description states: "This subspecies is named for the late Howard K. Gloyd, my close friend, colleague, and expert on pit vipers, especially the rattlesnakes. Gloyd worked for decades on the genus Agkistrodon (sensu lato), and he had predicted that a new race of A. bilineatus would eventually be described from lower Central America."

The common name castellana is the feminine form of the Spanish adjective castellano, translating to Castilian or Spaniard, but it is not entirely clear how this name came to be applied to A. howardgloydi. It has been speculated that it is something of an analogy, with the snake and the conquistadores being equally feared, or the snake and the conquistadores both being alert and ready to strike in a confrontation.

== Taxonomy and Phylogenetics ==
The molecular evidence indicates the genus Agkistrodon is a monophyletic group, with the copperheads, (A. contortrix and A. laticinctus) the most basal (ancestral) lineage of the genus, the cottonmouths (A. piscivorus) basal to the four cantil species, Taylor's cantil (A. taylori) basal to the common cantil (A. bilineatus), which is basal to the Yucatecan cantil (A. russeolus) and the castellaana (A. howardgloydi). Both molecular and morphological evidence indicate that Agkistrodon howardgloydi and Agkistrodon russeolus are more closely related to each other (sister taxa) than Agkistrodon bilineatus or Agkistrodon taylori.

In 1984, while preparing a monograph on the genus Agkistrodon, and after examining virtually all museum specimens of Agkistrodon from Central America known at that time, Roger Conant described Agkistrodon bilineatus howardgloydi as a subspecies of the common cantil (Agkistrodon bilineatus). In the following 30 years, subsequent accounts supported recognition of the subspecies. In a 2013 taxonomic reevaluation, all three subspecies of Agkistrodon bilineatus were elevated to full species (Agkistrodon bilineatus, Agkistrodon russeolus, and Agkistrodon howardgloydi) based on morphology, biogeography, and consideration of previous DNA-based studies.

== Description ==
Of the ten specimens of A. howardgloydi available to Gloyd and Conant (1990) from Nicaragua and Costa Rica, the largest male was 96 cm (37 3/4 in) and the largest female 82 cm (32 1/4 in) in total length (including tail). According to Villa (1984), adults in Nicaragua almost never exceed 135 cm (53 1/4 in) in length. In both sexes, the tail length is 19% of the total body length.

Scalation includes 23 rows of keeled dorsal scales at midbody; 128-135 ventral scales; and 54-61 subcaudal scales, roughly half of which are paired, especially towards the tail tip.

The dorsal color pattern consists of light to medium reddish brown ground color overlaid with 10-14/13-17 broad brown or brownish crossbands in males/females. Large adult males tend to be melanistic. Juveniles are more lightly colored, even to the point of being bright red. The head is clearly marked on either side with two longitudinal light lines: the upper one is narrow and broken or even absent posterior to the supraocular scale; while the lower one is wider and split into two parts which may or may not meet at the suture of the third supralabial scale.

Agkistrodon howardgloydi can be distinguish from other members of the genus Agkistrodon by the presence of a loreal scale (absent in cottonmouths A. piscivorus and A. conanti), and two distinctive white or light stripes on each side of the face (absent in copperheads A. contortrix and A. laticinctus). It can be distinguish from the other cantils by several moderately subtle markings on the head. Among the more obvious are the lower light stripes which are noticeably angled below the pit (at the seam of the second and third supralabials) appearing as a dip or small gap in the stripe (only rarely seen in A. russeolus, otherwise lower light stripe more or less straight or gently curved, running evenly and unbroken from the snout to the back of the mouth in other cantils). The bottom side of the head, chin and throat area, is orange or orange-brown and distinctly lighter than the ventral scales which abruptly turn darker on the neck and body.

== Distribution ==
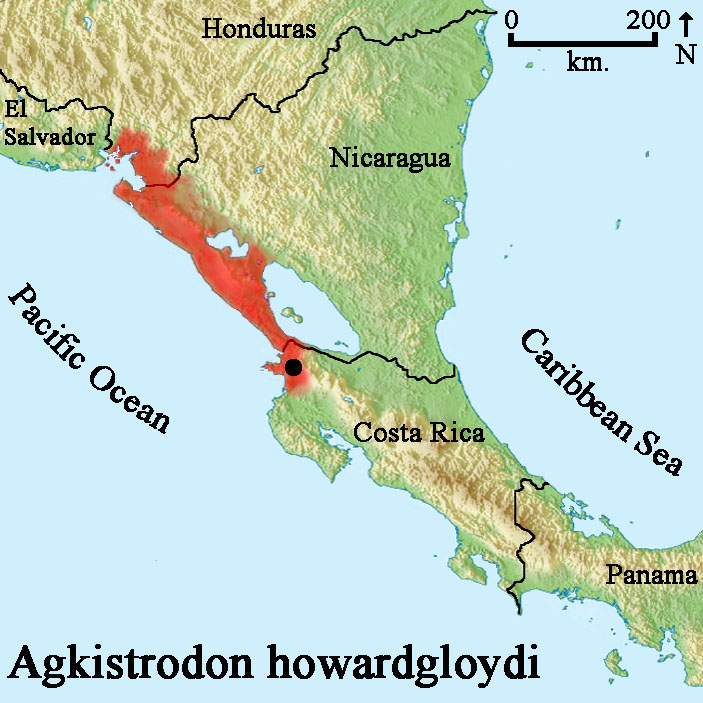
Distribution of the Southern Cantil (Agkistrodon howardgloydi), the black dot represents the type

Agkistrodon howardgloydi is found on the Pacific coast of Nicaragua, ranging north into the Gulf of Fonseca area in extreme southwest Honduras, and south into the Guanacaste Province of extreme northwest Costa Rica. It occurs on a relatively narrow strip of lowlands less than 400 km. north to south. The elevational range is from near sea level to no more than 600 m. In Costa Rica it has been reported from 20 to 285 m., and sea level to 300 m. elevation. The type locality given is "0.8 km north Mirador el Cañon del Tigre, Parque Nacional Santa Rosa, Provincia Guanacaste, Costa Rica".

== Diet ==
Fish, frogs, lizards, birds, eggs, and rodents were identified in the diet of A. howardgloydi in one Nicaraguan publication. A study conducted early in the rainy season of 1994 in Costa Rica found some age related variation in the diet: neonates (<38 cm.) contained frogs (Hypopachus) and lizards (Marisora, Holcosus); juveniles (38–50 cm.) contained frogs (Leptodactylus), lizards (Ctenosaura), and mice (Liomys); adults (>50 cm.) contained lizards (Ctenosaura), mice (Liomys), and rats (Sigmodon), suggesting an ontogenetic shift in diet from ectotherm prey in juveniles, to endotherm prey in adults.

== Conservation ==
In a 2013 conservation assessment, A. howardgloydi, was considered endangered (although this assessment had no political or legal standing), and using the Environmental Vulnerability Score (EVS) [low, 3–9; medium, 10–13; high, 14–20], Agkistrodon howardgloydi was rated 17, a species of high vulnerability. Agkistrodon howardgloydi is a rare species throughout most of its limited range. The lowland dry forests have been among the most severely impacted vegetation zones in Mesoamerica, with four centuries of clearing for farming and ranchland leaving very little of the original vegetation intact. Efforts to locate the species in the Gulf of Fonseca area in Honduras in the late 1990s were unsuccessful and it was concluded that population densities there were very low, or possibly even extirpated from the area. Only in a few remote, protected areas in Costa Rica was A. howardgloydi still reported to be observed with some regularly at the end of the 20th century.

== Colloquialisms and folklore ==
The name cantil is applied to all Agkistrodon on the Pacific coast from Mexico to Costa Rica. Likewise, vibora castellana is another name used for both Agkistrodon bilineatus and A. howardgloydi on the Pacific coast of Guatemala to Costa Rica. In Nicaragua the names bil palka, dimuih palka, castellana de jáquima, charquera, and toboba have all been used for the species.
