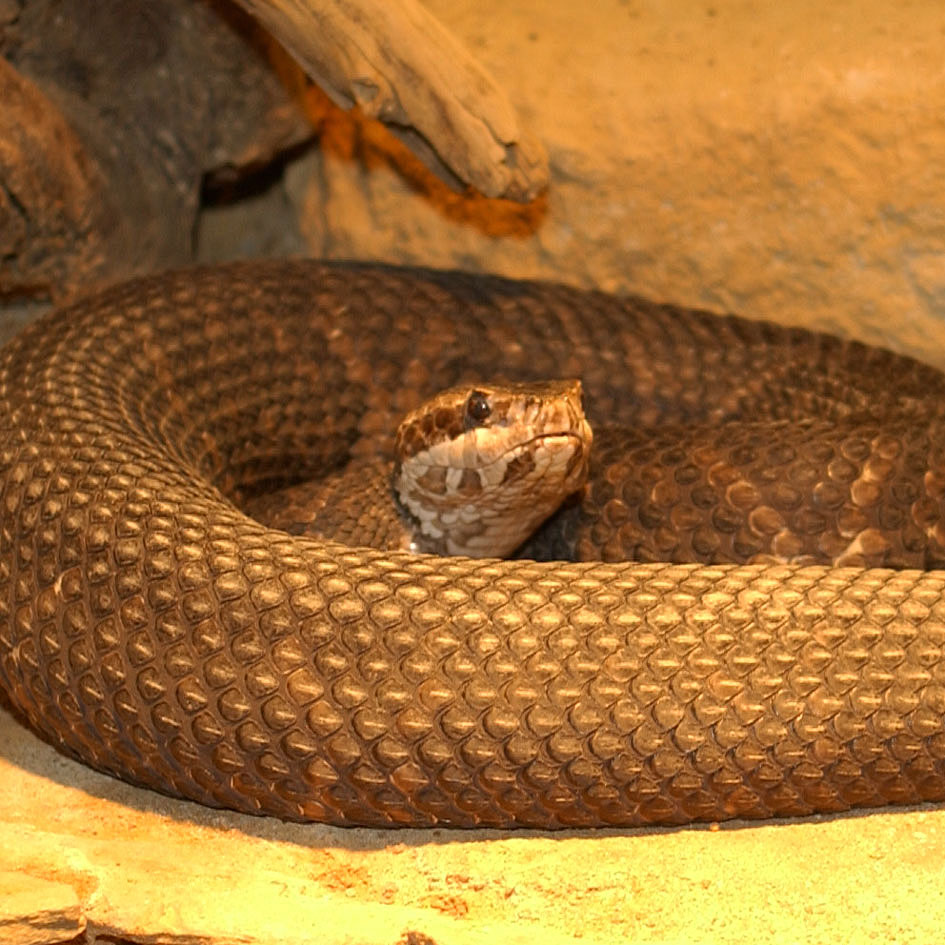

Scientific classification
- Kingdom: Animalia
- Phylum: Chordata
- Class: Reptilia
- Order: Squamata
- Suborder: Serpentes
- Family: Viperidae
- Genus: Agkistrodon
- Species: A. conanti

Binomial name
- Agkistrodon conanti Gloyd, 1969

= Florida cottonmouth =

Species of snake

The Florida cottonmouth (Agkistrodon conanti) is a species of venomous snake, a pit viper in the subfamily Crotalinae of the family Viperidae. The species is endemic to the United States, where it occurs in southern Georgia and the Florida peninsula in nearly every type of wetlands in the region, including brackish water and offshore islands. However, it is not entirely dependent on water and is occasionally encountered as far as a mile (1.6 km.) from surface water. Agkistrodon conanti venom is very hemolytic and known to cause relatively extensive necrosis compared to many snake venoms, and can sometimes be lethal with a 17% mortality rate. It is often confused with harmless watersnakes (Nerodia) and other semi-aquatic species with which it shares its habitat.

It is a moderately large, thick bodied snake, adults averaging 30 to 48 inches (76-122 cm) in length, but rare individuals can exceed 6 feet (183 cm). The head is marked with conspicuous black cheek stripes on each side, set off by light cream or white stripes above and below. The body is olive brown, dark brown, to black and with 10 to 17 dark bands. The dark bands are often darker at the edges but lighter with irregular markings or spotting in the center. The snakes often grow darker with age, and the banding and patterns can be obscure or absent on adults. It is a viviparous species, normally giving birth to 6 to 8 young, which bear the same pattern as adults but are clay-red or "red dirt" in color. It was first described in the late 1960s as a subspecies, Agkistrodon piscivorus conanti, however molecular research published in 2015 justified elevating it to a full species.

== Etymology ==
In the original description, Howard K. Gloyd wrote it was "named in honor of a friend and colleague, Roger Conant, Director of the Philadelphia Zoological Garden, whose professional achievements and dynamic promotion of the study of herpetology for amateurs merit highest commendation." Roger Conant wrote Reptile Study for the Boy Scouts of America's merit badge series and the original Peterson Field Guide to Reptiles and Amphibians of Eastern and Central North America, one of the most popular and authoritative field guides on North American herpetofauna. He was a leading authority on North American watersnakes (Nerodia), and with Gloyd, he coauthored a seminal monograph on the genus Agkistrodon. Conant also named the southern cantil (Agkistrodon howardgloydi) in honor of Gloyd.

== Taxonomy and phylogenetics ==
The Florida cottonmouth is one of eight species in the genus Agkistrodon that includes the copperheads, cottonmouths, and cantils. Molecular evidence indicates the genus Agkistrodon is a monophyletic group, meaning they all share a common ancestor. The copperheads (Agkistrodon contortrix and A. laticinctus) are the most basal (ancestral) living lineage of the genus, with the cottonmouths (Agkistrodon piscivorus and A. conanti) basal to Taylor's cantil (A. taylori), and A. taylori basal to the remaining cantils of Latin America. The northern cottonmouth (Agkistrodon piscivorus) is the sister taxon (closest relative) of the Florida cottonmouth (Agkistrodon conanti).

The Florida cottonmouth was first described as a subspecies, Agkistrodon piscivorus conanti, as recently as 1969. The holotype is a young adult male in the United States National Museum (USNM 165962), and the type locality is "at the edge of Rochelle-Cross Creek Road, about 7 miles southeast of Gainesville, Alachua County, Florida" . Seven additional paratypes were designated in the original description. Agkistrodon conanti was elevated to a full species in 2015 based on molecular data, phylogenetic evidence, and distinct ecological niches. Several subsequent reviews and species accounts supported the recognition of Agkistrodon conanti as a species.

== Description ==
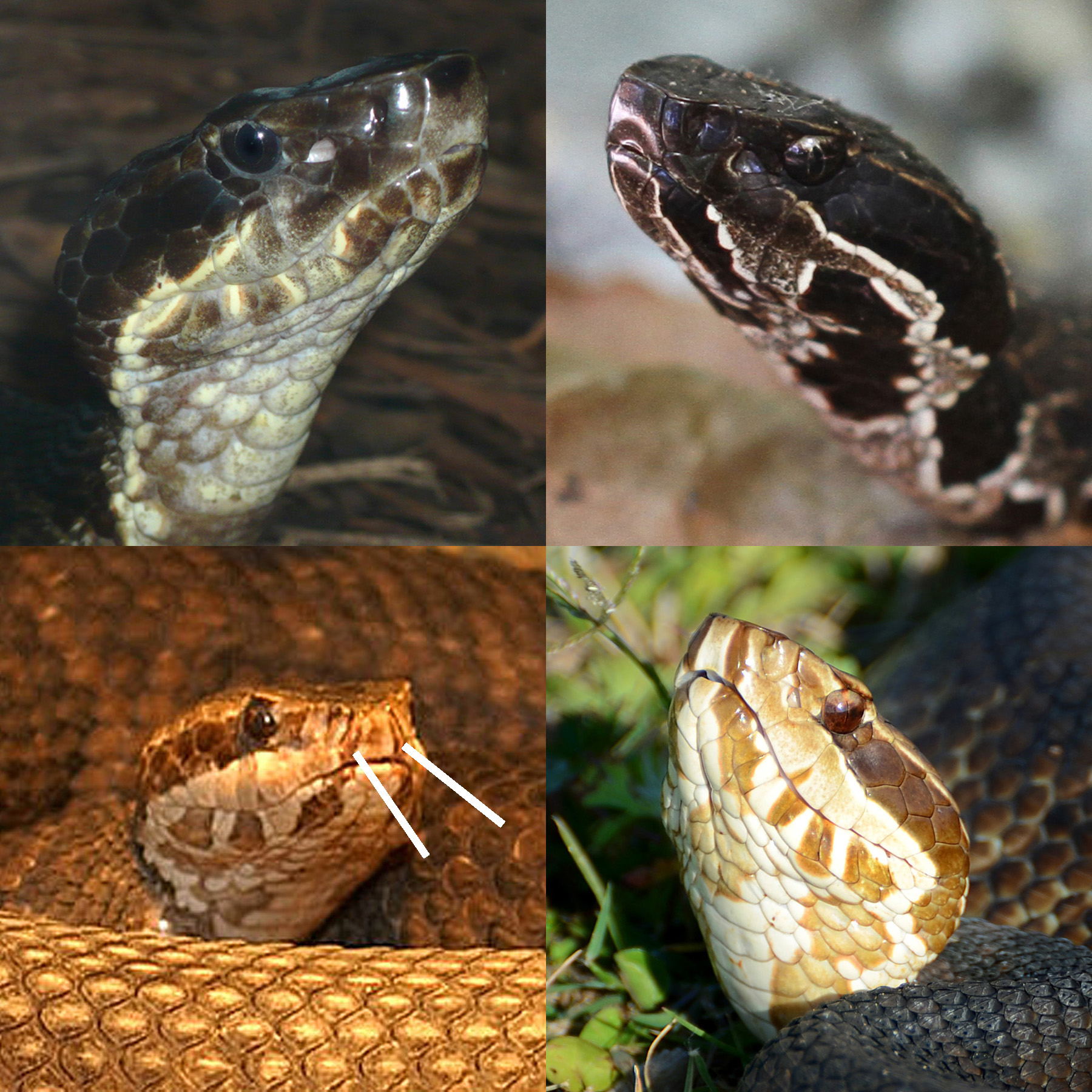
Top row: northern cottonmouth; bottom row: Florida cottonmouth; although the facial patterns are variable in both species, the overall lighter, cleaner face markings are characteristic of the Florida cottonmouth and the two dark vertical lines on the snout are diagnostic of the species)

Adults of A. conanti grow up to 1,892 mm (74.5 inches) in total length (including tail). Allen and Swindell (1948) reported one male specimen from Marion County, Florida that measured 1,829 mm (72 inches) in total length and weighed 4.6 kg (10 pounds).

The color pattern is very similar to that of A. piscivorus, apart from head markings that are plainly visible even in older darker specimens of A. conanti: with dark postocular stripes that are bordered above and below by narrow light lines. A pair of dark stripes are also visible at the front of the lower jaw. Mature specimens often lack any dorsal pattern, while the dorsal patterns of juveniles are more pronounced.

The Florida cottonmouth (Agkistrodon conanti) differs from the northern cottonmouth (Agkistrodon piscivorus) in having a pair of dark vertical lines at the tip of the snout (running down the seams of the rostral, prenasals, and first supralabial scales). Additionally the patterns and markings on the head of the Florida cottonmouth are typically lighter, cleaner, and more sharply defined in all except a few old individuals. Agkistrodon conanti also has a longer tail, mean relative tail length 17.4% in adult and subadult males (mean relative tail length 15.9% in adult and subadult males in Agkistrodon piscivorus).

The cottonmouths differs from all other members of the genus Agkistrodon in the absence of a loreal scale and 25 mid-body dorsal scale rows, rarely 23 or 27 (mid-body dorsal scale rows typically 23 [rarely 21 or 25] and loreal scale present in all other species). Additionally, the third supralabial usually reaches the eye orbit (small scales are usually between supralabials and the eye orbit in all other species).

== Distribution ==
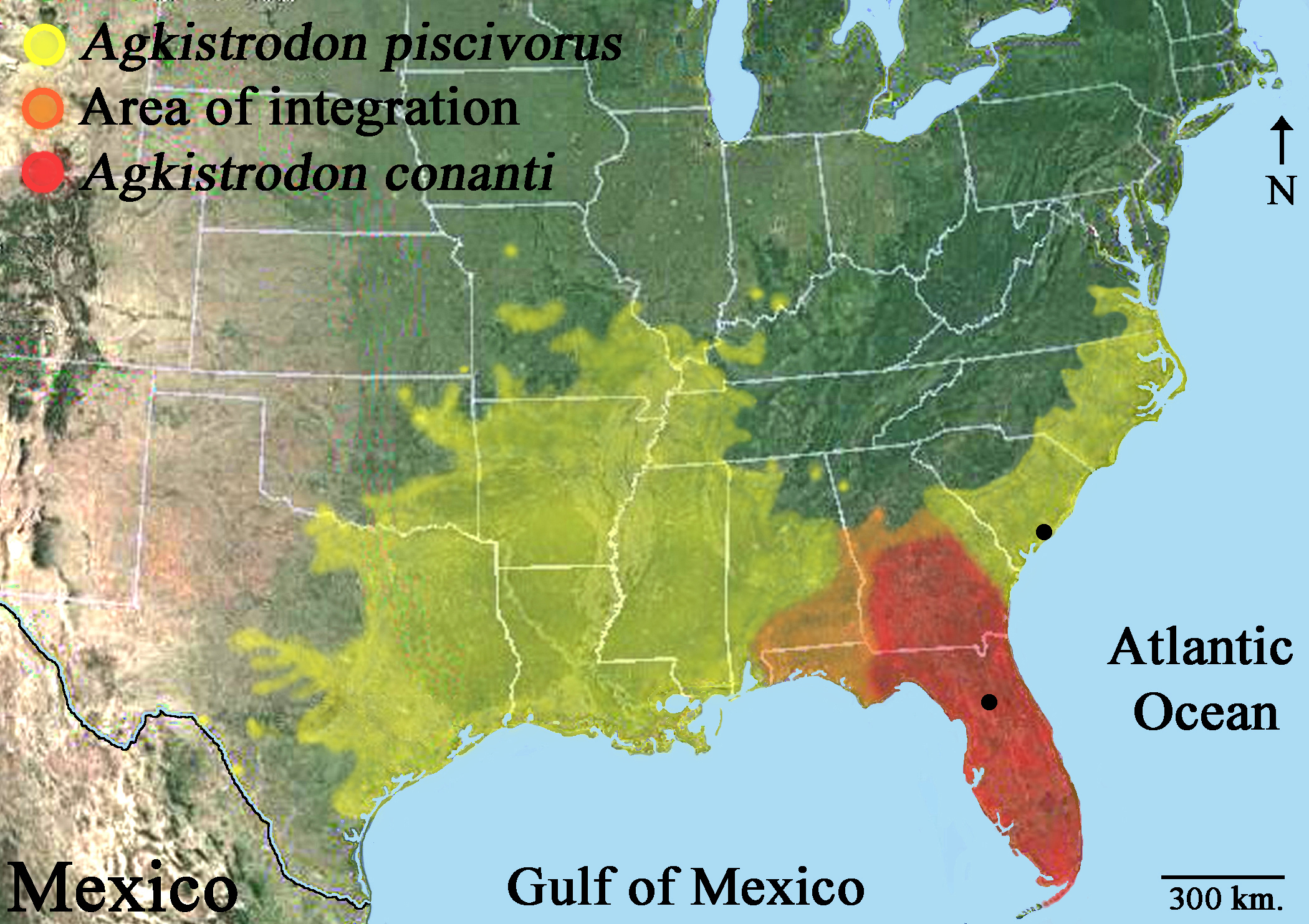
Geographic distribution of the two species of cottonmouth, A. piscivorus and A. conanti; black dots represent the type localities

Agkistrodon conanti is found in the southeast of the United States, throughout the Florida peninsula, including many barrier islands and keys, and into southern Georgia. The Florida cottonmouth ranges into the Florida Keys at least as far as Big Pine Key. The exact origin of a 19th century record from Key West is questionable, although by the end of the 20th century, no additional records had appeared and no suitable habitat remains there.

Sources vary on the exact areas and extent of the zone of integration between A. conanti and A. piscivorus. Earlier subspecies accounts all mapped different and various regions of integration. In one study ecological niche models predicted hybridization might occur from North Carolina to the southern coastal plains in southeastern Louisiana, however molecular data (DNA) from the same study indicated samples from individuals from the Savannah, Georgia area northward, as well as from areas north and west of Mobile Bay, Alabama were A. piscivorus (with the exception of a single hybrid from southern Mississippi).

== Ecology and natural history ==
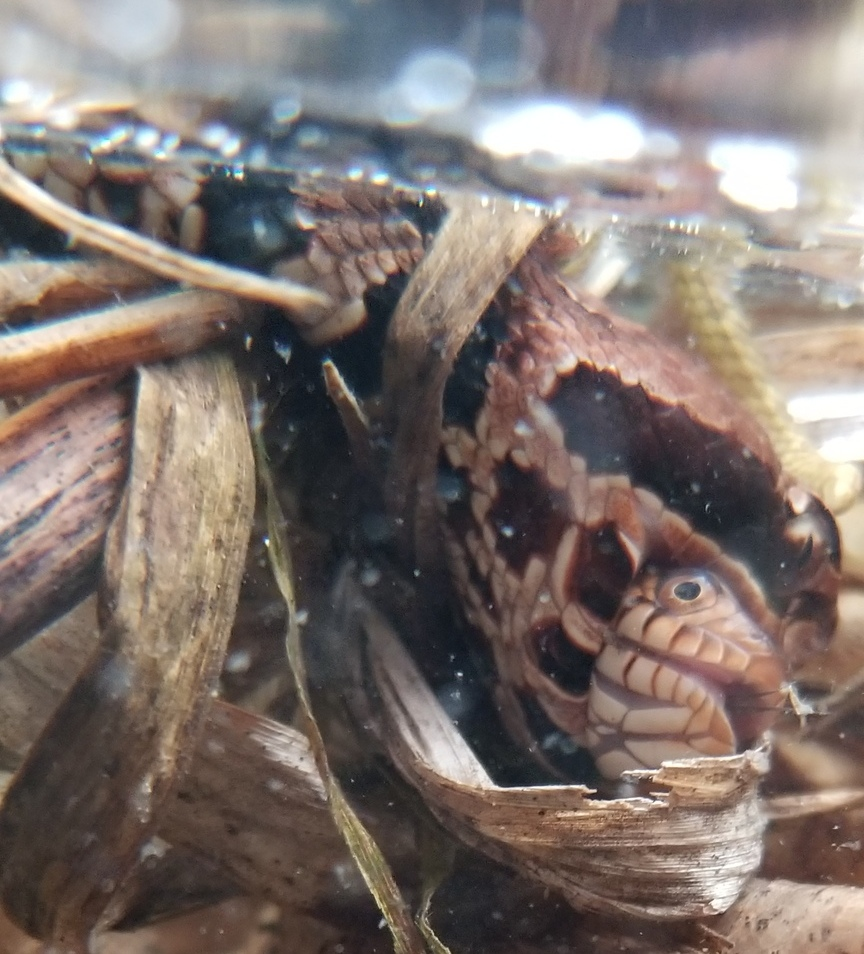
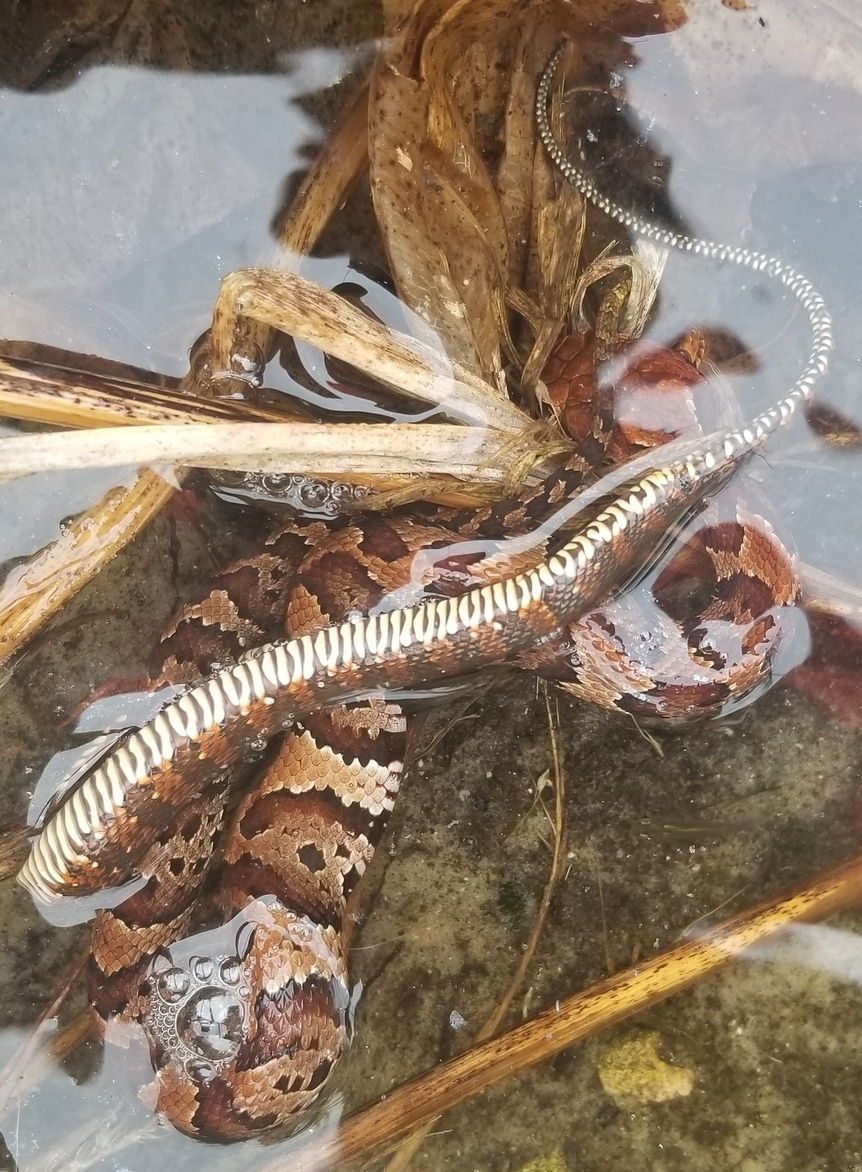
Eating a Florida banded water snake

=== Habitat ===
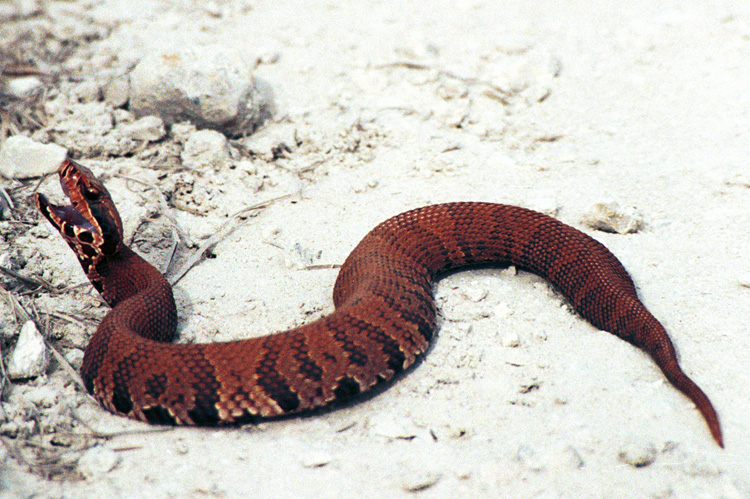
A. conanti, Big Cypress National Preserve, Florida

According to Wright and Bishop (1915), in the Okefenokee Swamp A. conanti occurs in thickets along the edges of the cypress ponds of the islands, around the wooded edges of stretches of water, in areas where the woods of the islands meet pine woods, and throughout the swamp in general.

In the Everglades, Allen and Swindell (1948) mentioned that it can be found in palmetto clumps as much as a quarter mile from water. Otherwise these snakes tend to aggregate around drying water holes, most likely because of the increasing concentration of available prey. Duellman and Schwartz (1958) described the species as inhabiting aquatic environments, cypress flats and wet prairies, but not pine forests, scrub or hammocks. The latter is contradicted by a report from northern Florida where large numbers were seen in wet pine-palmetto areas, except during very dry periods.

=== Reproduction ===
Agkistrodon conanti is ovoviviparous, and while there is no specific mating season, most births occur during the summer months. Females generally only breed every other year and give birth to between one and 15 young per litter. The average total length of each newly born snake is 18 cm (7.1 in).

== Colloquialisms and folklore ==
Colloquial names for the Florida cottonmouth include aquatic copperhead, aquatic moccasin, cotton-mouthed snake, gaper, gapper, lake moccasin, mangrove rattler, moccasin viper, North American water viper, pond moccasin, river pit viper, short-tailed moccasin, small-tailed rattler, snap jaw, stub-tail moccasin, swamp lion, swamp moccasin, trap jaw, water mamba, water moccasin, water pilot, water pit moccasin, water rattlesnake, white mouth moccasin, and worm-tailed moccasin.

== Gallery ==
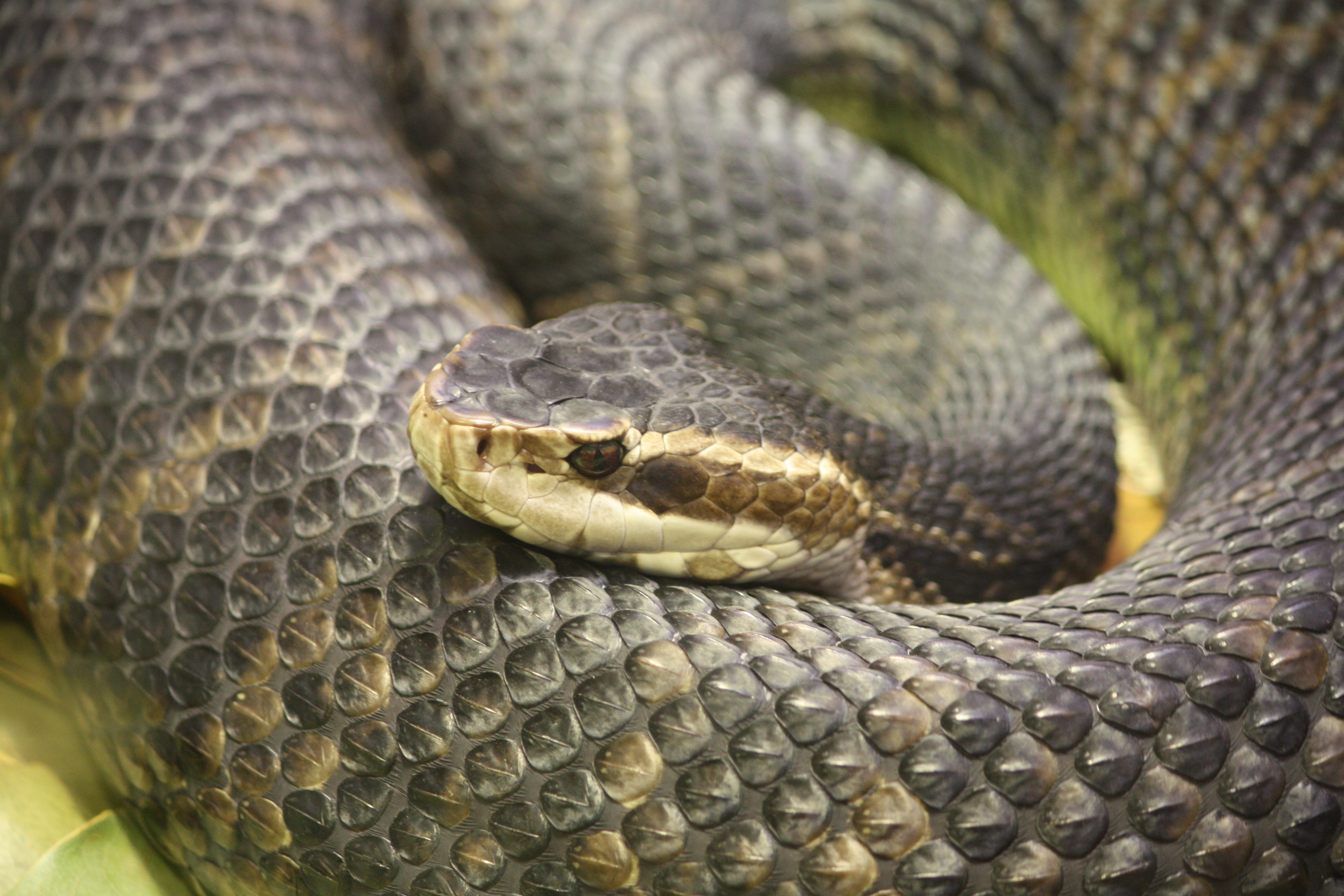
Florida cottonmouth (Agkistrodon conanti) at the Cincinnati Zoo

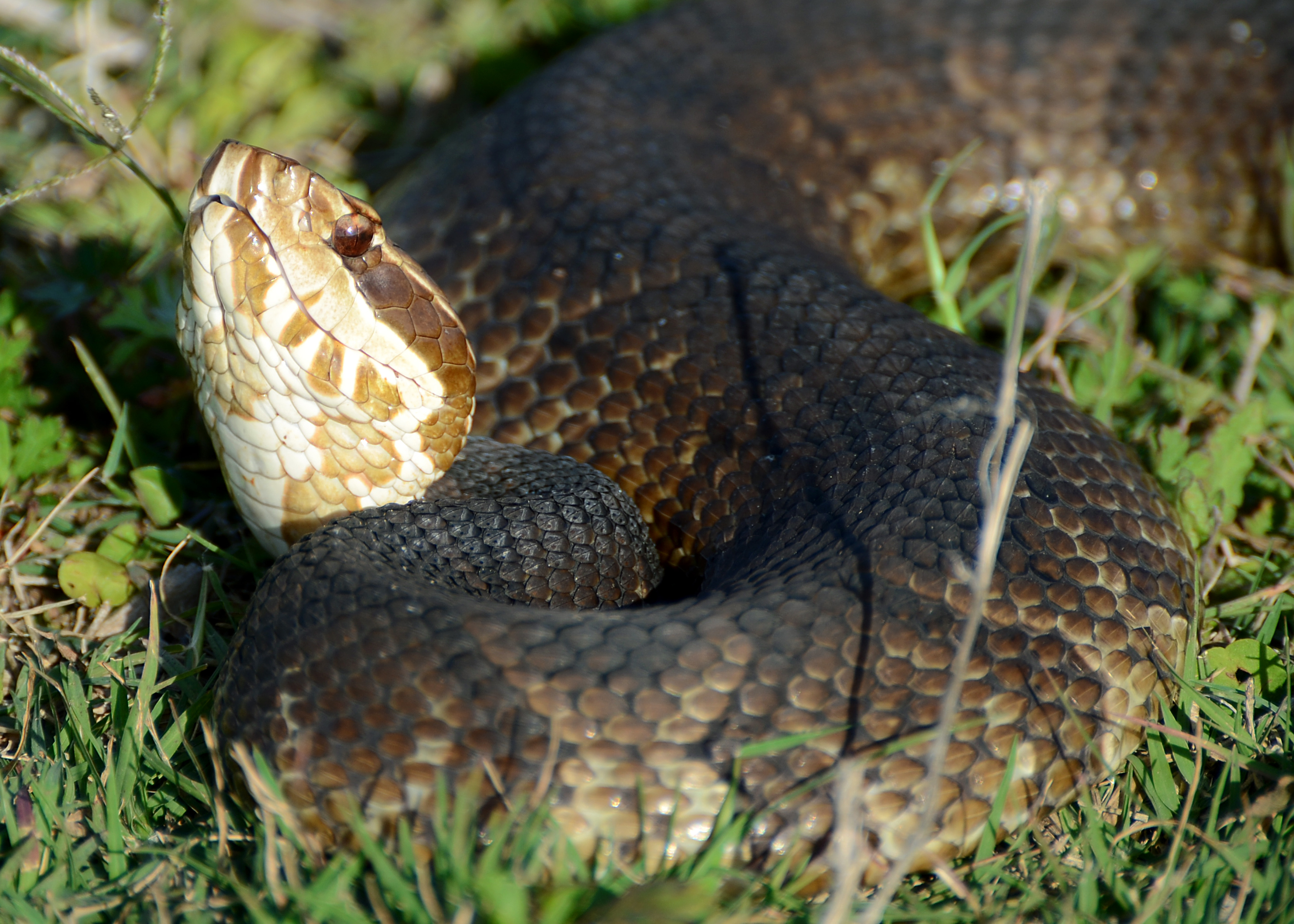
Florida cottonmouth (A. conanti) from Alachua County, Florida (23 March 2011)

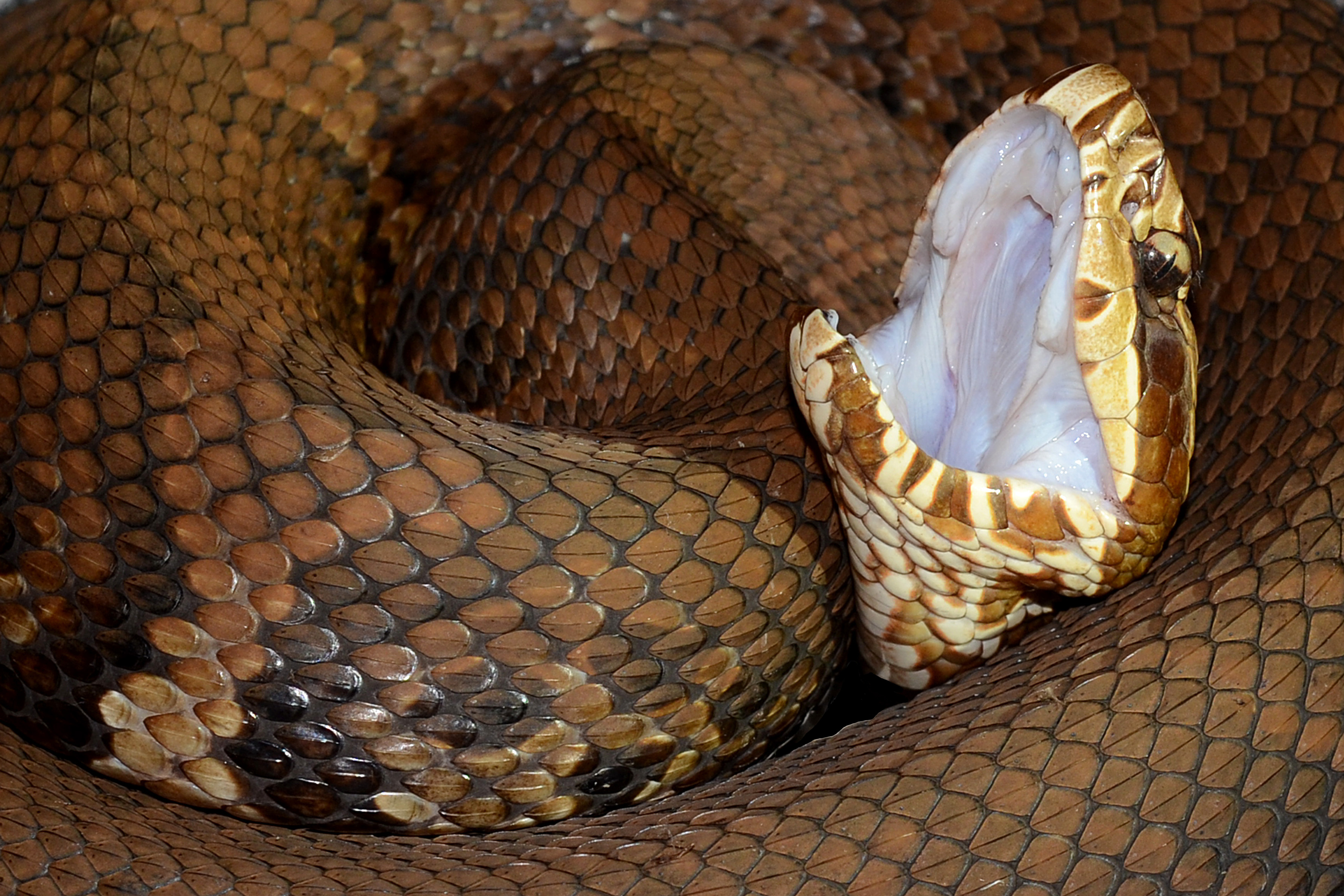
Typical defensive display of a Florida cottonmouth (A. conanti) from north-central Florida (9 April 2011)
