= Krzysztof Kasztelan =

Polish footballer

Personal information
- Full name: Krzysztof Kasztelan
- Date of birth: 10 August 1961 (age 65)
- Place of birth: Łódź, Poland
- Height: 1.78 m (5 ft 10 in)
- Position: Forward

Youth career
- 1979–1980: Unia Skierniewice
- 1981: ŁKS Łódź

Senior career*
Years	Team	Apps	(Gls)
1982	Orzeł Łódź		
1983	Bzura Chodaków		
1983–1986	ŁKS Łódź	51	(3)
1986–1989	Hutnik Kraków		
1992	Yukong Elephants	2	(0)
1993–1994	Włókniarz Pabianice		
- * Club domestic league appearances and goals

Krzysztof Kasztelan (born 10 August 1961) is a Polish former professional footballer who played mainly as a forward.

Kasztelan started his career as a trainee with Unia Skierniewice. In 1983, he made his Ekstraklasa debut, playing for ŁKS Łódź. He ended up playing three seasons for the Łódź based club, before joining Hutnik Kraków in 1986.

In 1992, he had a brief spell in South Korea, where he joined his former ŁKS teammate, Witold Bendkowski, playing for Yukong Elephants in the K-League. He finished his career in Poland at Włókniarz Pabianice.

His son, Adrian Kasztelan, is also a footballer.
