= Erin Castellan =

Erin Castellan is a contemporary artist who creates works in paint and textile processes.

== Early life and education ==
Castellan is from Morgantown, West Virginia, Castellan received an MFA from Indiana University’s Henry Radford Hope School of Fine Arts and a BFA from Rhode Island School of Design.

== Work ==
She currently works as an independent artist in Asheville, North Carolina. She is a featured artist in the national traveling exhibit, FABRICation, including work by seven artists who use fabric in their work which has been traveling since 2013 at venues including Herron Galleries at the Herron School of Art and Design in Indianapolis, Purdue University Galleries, and The Art Museum of West Virginia University in Morgantown among others. Her work can be viewed at http://www.erinecastellan.com/
