= Adrian Kasztelan =

Polish footballer

Personal information
- Full name: Adrian Kasztelan
- Date of birth: 27 July 1986 (age 40)
- Place of birth: Łódź, Poland
- Height: 1.83 m (6 ft 0 in)
- Position: Midfielder

Team information
- Current team: Iskra Dobroń
- Number: 22

Youth career
- ŁKS Łódź

Senior career*
Years	Team	Apps	(Gls)
2004–2005	ŁKS Łódź	2	(0)
2006	Gawin Królewska Wola		
2006–2007	Korona Kielce II	8	(2)
2007–2008	Korona Kielce	1	(0)
2008	Ruch Chorzów	0	(0)
2009	Sokół Aleksandrów Łódzki	14	(1)
2009–2012	Znicz Pruszków	47	(4)
2012–2013	Pogoń Grodzisk Mazowiecki	24	(0)
2013–2015	ŁKS Łódź		
2015–2019	Termy Uniejów		
2020–2023	GKS Ksawerów	78	(1)
2024–	Iskra Dobroń	29	(1)
- * Club domestic league appearances and goals as of 17:09, 24 June 2025 (UTC)

Adrian Kasztelan (born 27 July 1986) is a Polish professional footballer who plays as a midfielder for regional league club Iskra Dobroń. He also played for clubs such as ŁKS Łódź, Korona Kielce, Ruch Chorzów and Znicz Pruszków, among others.

His father, Krzysztof Kasztelan was also a footballer for ŁKS Łódź.

== Honours ==
ŁKS Łódź

- IV liga Łódź: 2013–14
