= Sierra de San Carlos =

Mountain range in Mexico

- Sierra Chiquita
- Location within Mexico

Geography
- Location: Tamaulipas, Mexico
- Range coordinates: 24°20′N 99°02′W

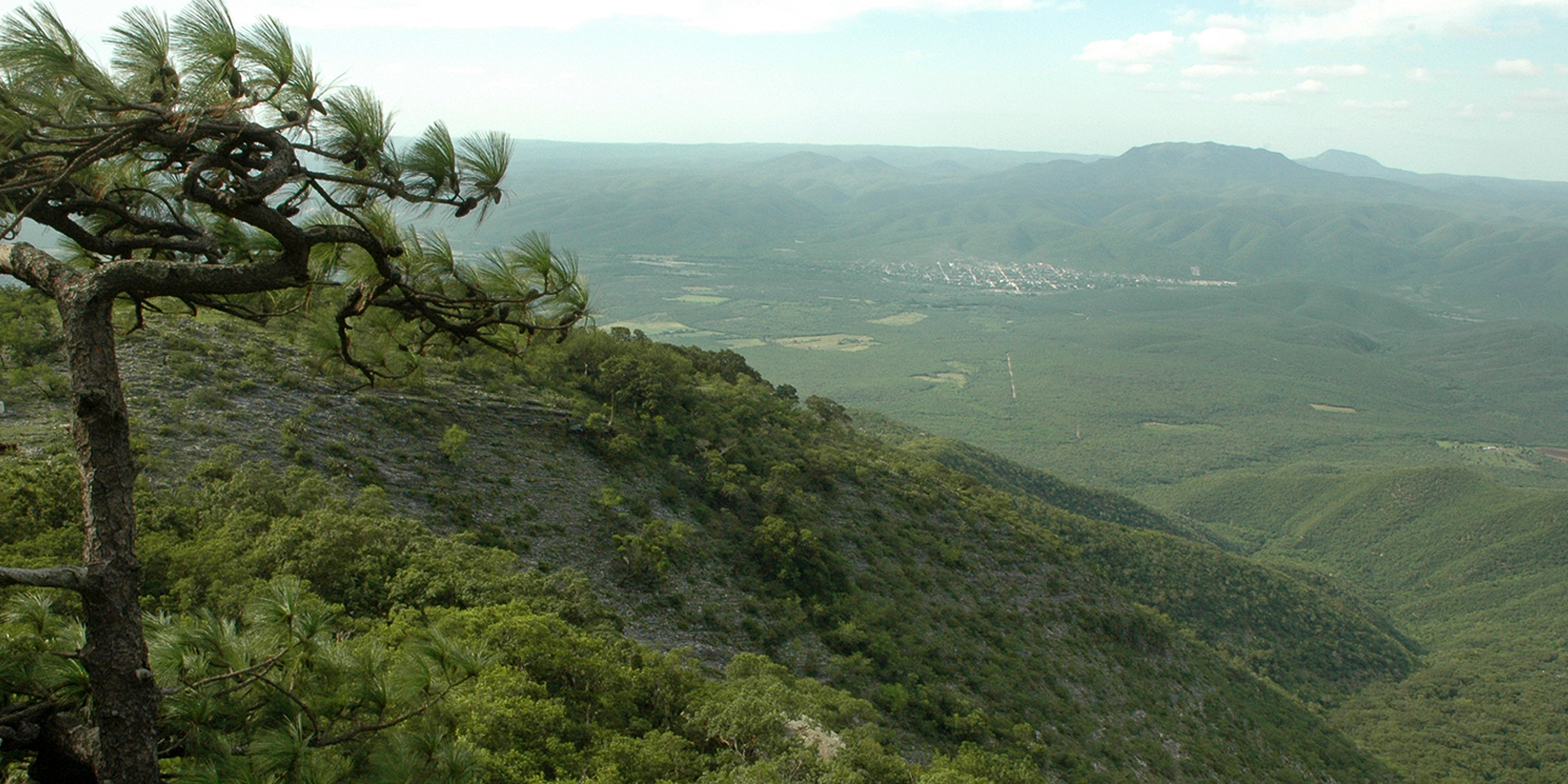
Sierra San Carlos near Bufa El Diente, looking north to the town of San Carlos (seen just right of center in mid-ground), and a pine tree (Pinus teocote) growing on the left. Municipality of San Carlos, Tamaulipas, Mexico (12 July 2007)

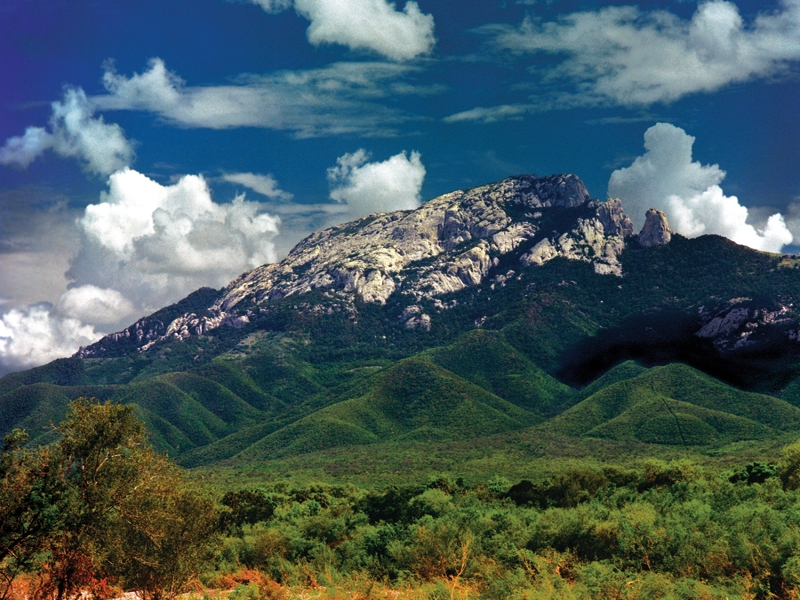
Sierra Chiquita with the isolated "tooth-like" Bufa El Diente protruding on the right. photographed 1 November 2010

Sierra de San Carlos, also known as the Sierra Chiquita, is an isolated mountain range in the state of Tamaulipas, Mexico. The climate is semi-arid. The highest point is Cerro El Hongo with an elevation of 1,786 metres (5,860 ft) at a location of 24° 34′ 20″ North Latitude and 99° 04′ 24″ West Longitude. Most of the San Carlos range is much lower, averaging 600 metres (2,000 ft) to 800 metres (2,600 ft) in elevation.

== Geography ==
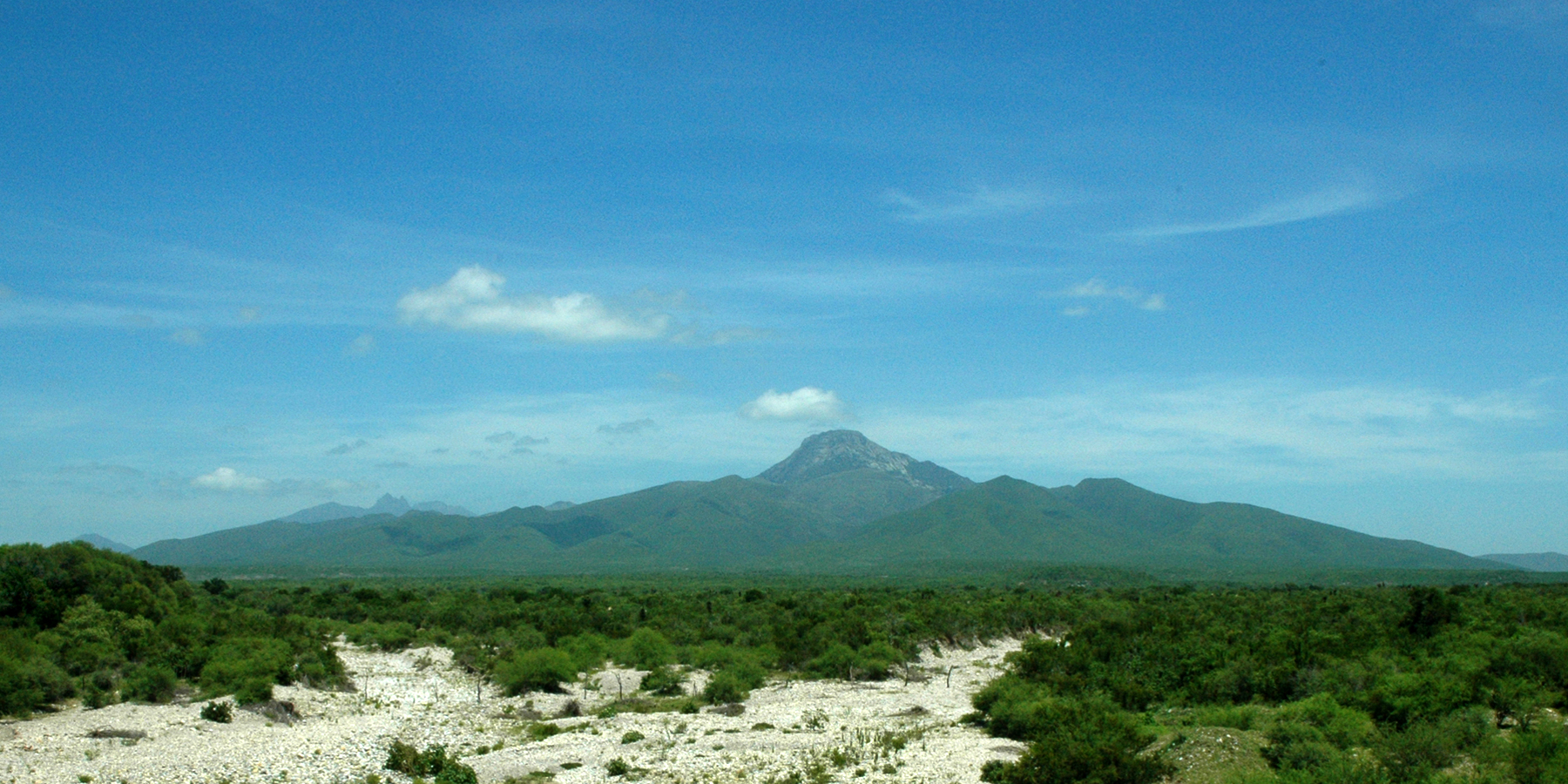
Sierra San Carlos seen from the south, Municipality of San Carlos, Tamaulipas, Mexico (14 July 2007)

The Sierra de San Carlos (Spanish for Saint Charles Mountain Range), southeast of the city of Linares, Mexico is about 50 miles (80 km) east to west and 20 miles (32 km) north to south. It covers a total area of 896 square miles (2,320 km^{2}). The Sierra is located between 24 and 25 north latitude and 98 30 and 99 10 west longitude. Elevation ranges from 1,000 to 5,859 feet (305 to 1,786 m).

No major highways or rivers cross the Sierra, nor are there any large towns or cities. The population is rural or resides in small villages.

== Flora and fauna ==
Five types of vegetation cover have been identified in the Sierra. Desert thorn shrub (Tamaulipan matorral) is the most common vegetation in northeastern Mexico and covers the driest areas in the Sierra up to 1,600 feet (300 to 500 m) in elevation. A thorn forest mixed with grassland is found at altitudes of 1,200 to 2,000 feet (370 to 610 metres). A low deciduous forest averaging about 25 feet (7.6 m) in height covers the hillsides at elevations of 1,700 to 3,000 feet (520 to 910 metres). In the cooler temperatures at the higher altitudes in the Sierra oak-pine forests are characteristic at elevations of more than 800 meters (2,600 feet). About 13 percent of the total area consists of oak and oak-pine forests.

A small amount of riparian forest mixed with tall grasses is found along streams and near reservoirs. The riparian forests feature species such as hickory (Carya palmeri) more characteristic of the United States than Mexico. Most of the forests in the Sierra are intact, as they are not of sufficient quality to encourage commercial timber harvesting.

== Climate ==
The Sierra de San Carlos has a semi-arid climate with hot summers and mild winters. Precipitation in the Sierra averages about 28 inches (710 mm) annually. Most precipitation is in the summer between May and October, although winters are not as dry as in much of Mexico. The climate of the hamlet of San Nicolás is typical of the higher and cooler elevations in the Sierra. The climatic classification of the higher elevations of the Sierra de San Carlos is Cfa (sub-tropical, humid, hot summers) under the Kőppen Classification system or Crhl under the Trewartha climate classification system. Lower elevations would be BSh (Semi-arid steppe with hot summers).

Climate data for San Nicolás, Tamaulipas. 24 41 36N, 98 49 46W. Elevation: 2,615 ft (797 m)(1950-2010)
Month	Jan	Feb	Mar	Apr	May	Jun	Jul	Aug	Sep	Oct	Nov	Dec	Year
Record high °C (°F)	38.0 (100.4)	39.0 (102.2)	43.0 (109.4)	45.0 (113.0)	42.0 (107.6)	47.0 (116.6)	42.0 (107.6)	40.0 (104.0)	39.0 (102.2)	38.0 (100.4)	37.0 (98.6)	38.0 (100.4)	47.0 (116.6)
Mean daily maximum °C (°F)	19.8 (67.6)	22.3 (72.1)	25.2 (77.4)	29.2 (84.6)	31.2 (88.2)	31.9 (89.4)	32.1 (89.8)	31.9 (89.4)	29.5 (85.1)	26.6 (79.9)	23.8 (74.8)	20.4 (68.7)	27.0 (80.6)
Daily mean °C (°F)	13.8 (56.8)	15.7 (60.3)	19.0 (66.2)	22.1 (71.8)	24.8 (76.6)	25.9 (78.6)	26.1 (79.0)	26.0 (78.8)	23.9 (75.0)	21.0 (69.8)	17.7 (63.9)	14.6 (58.3)	20.9 (69.6)
Mean daily minimum °C (°F)	7.8 (46.0)	9.1 (48.4)	12.1 (53.8)	15.1 (59.2)	18.3 (64.9)	19.9 (67.8)	20.2 (68.4)	20.0 (68.0)	18.3 (64.9)	15.3 (59.5)	11.7 (53.1)	8.8 (47.8)	14.7 (58.5)
Record low °C (°F)	−5 (23)	−7 (19)	−1 (30)	—	—	—	—	—	—	2.0 (35.6)	−2.0 (28.4)	−7.0 (19.4)	−5.0 (23.0)
Average precipitation mm (inches)	35.0 (1.38)	16.0 (0.63)	19.0 (0.75)	37.0 (1.46)	79.0 (3.11)	76.0 (2.99)	72.0 (2.83)	82.0 (3.23)	149.0 (5.87)	77.0 (3.03)	28.0 (1.10)	29.0 (1.14)	700.0 (27.56)
Average precipitation days (≥ 0.1 mm)	3.9	2.9	1.8	3.0	4.5	4.38	3.7	4.6	7.0	4.1	2.9	3.1	45.8
Source: Weatherbase: San Nicolas, Tamaulipas
