= Castellania (disambiguation) =

A castellania was the smallest administrative subdivision of land in parts of medieval Europe.

Castellania may also refer to:

- Castellania Coppi, a commune in Alessandria, Italy
- Castellania (Valletta), the former law courts in Valletta, Malta
- Terra Alta (comarca) or Castellania, a comarca in Catalonia, Spain
- Inquisitor's Palace or Castellania, a palace in Birgu, Malta

== See also ==
- Castellan, the governor or captain of a castellany and its castle
- Castellana (disambiguation)
