= Castellana =

Castellana may refer to:

== Places ==
- La Castellana (TransMilenio), a bus rapid transit station in Bogota, Colombia
- Castellana Grotte, a town in the province of Bari, Italy
  - Castellana Caves, a cave system in the municipality
- Castellana Sicula, a town in the province of Palermo, Italy.
- Civita Castellana, a town in the province of Viterbo, 65 km north of Rome, Italy
- La Castellana, Negros Occidental, a town in the province of Negros Occidental, Philippines
- Castellana (Madrid), a ward in the Salamanca district of Madrid, Spain
- Paseo de la Castellana, the widest and longest street in Madrid, Spain
- La Castellana, Caracas, a neighbourhood in Caracas, Venezuela

== Other meanings ==
- Anís La Castellana, a Spanish brand of anise liquor
- Castellana (Agkistrodon howardgloydi), a venomous pitviper species native to Costa Rica, Honduras, and Nicaragua
- A.C. Castellana Calcio, Associazione Calcistica Castellana Calcio is an Italian association football club

== See also ==
- Castellan, the governor or captain of a castellany and its castle
- Castellania (disambiguation)
