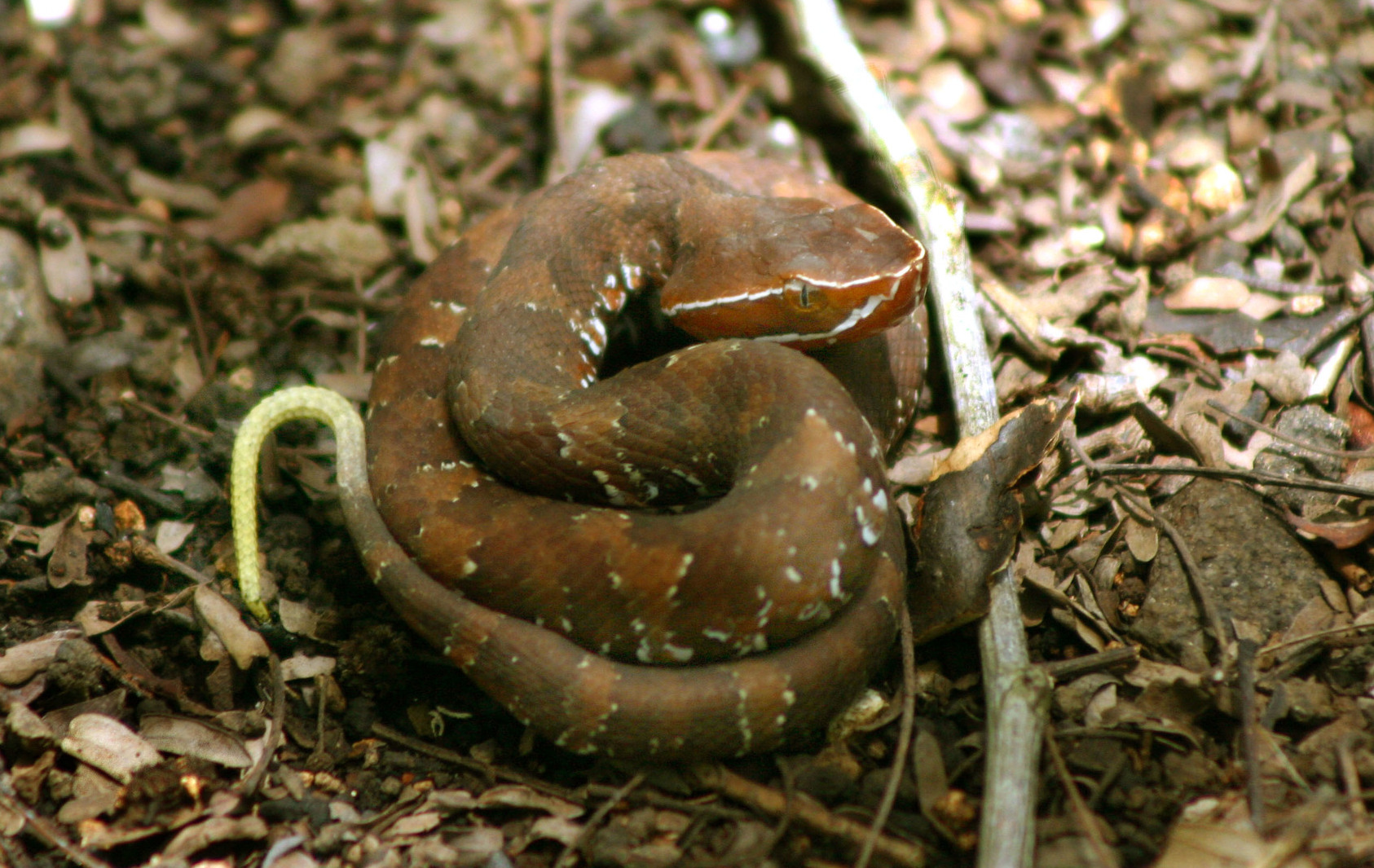
- A juvenile, Quintana Roo, Mexico

Scientific classification
- Kingdom: Animalia
- Phylum: Chordata
- Class: Reptilia
- Order: Squamata
- Suborder: Serpentes
- Family: Viperidae
- Genus: Agkistrodon
- Species: A. russeolus

Binomial name
- Agkistrodon russeolus Gloyd, 1972
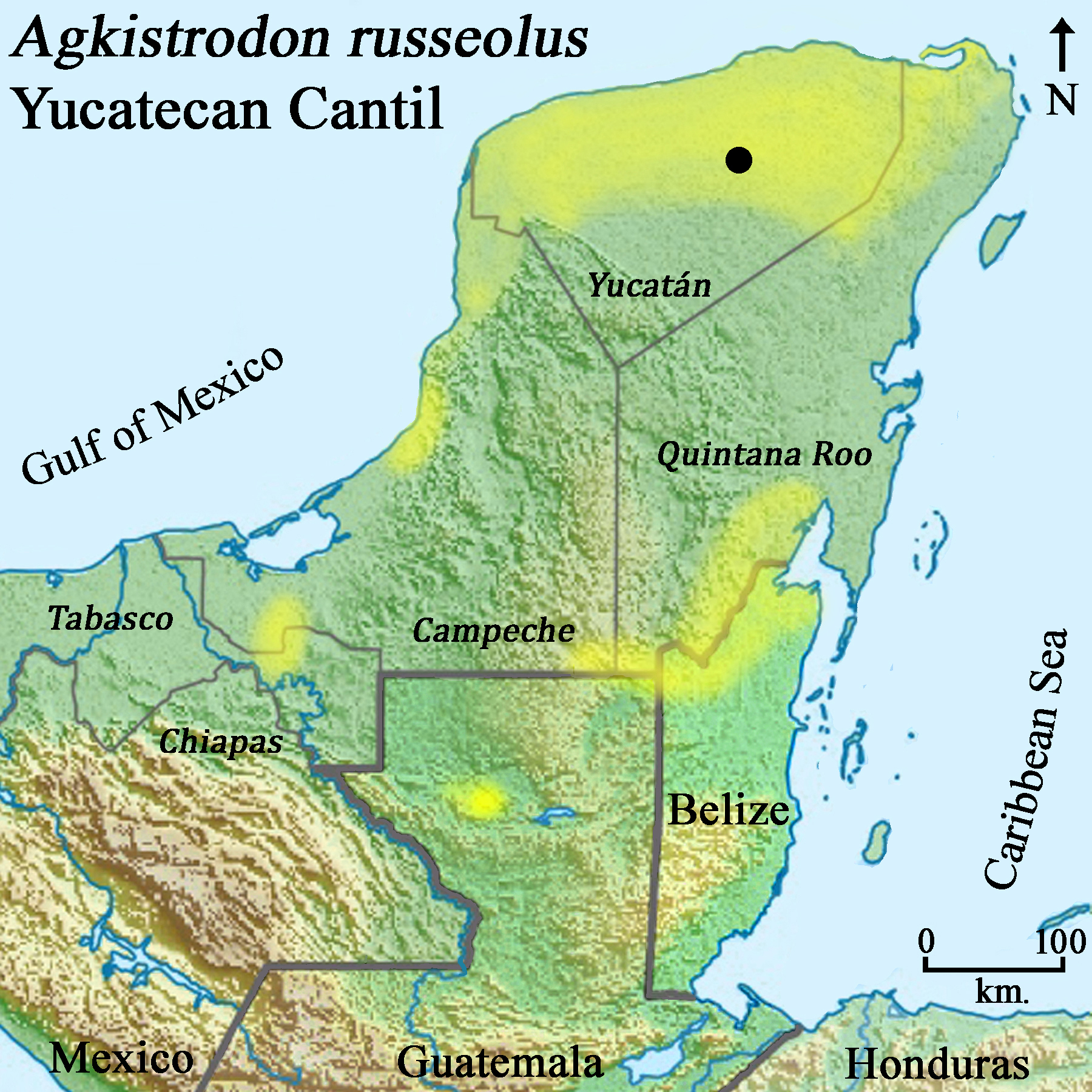
- Distribution of the Yucatán cantil, (Agkistrodon russeolus) highlighted in yellow, black dot = type locality

Synonyms
- Agkistrodon bilineatus russeolus Gloyd, 1972; Agkistrodon russeolus Porras et al., 2013

= Agkistrodon russeolus =

Species of snake

Agkistrodon russeolus, commonly called the Yucatecan cantil, is a venomous pit viper species endemic to the Yucatán Peninsula in Mexico and northern Belize.

== Description ==
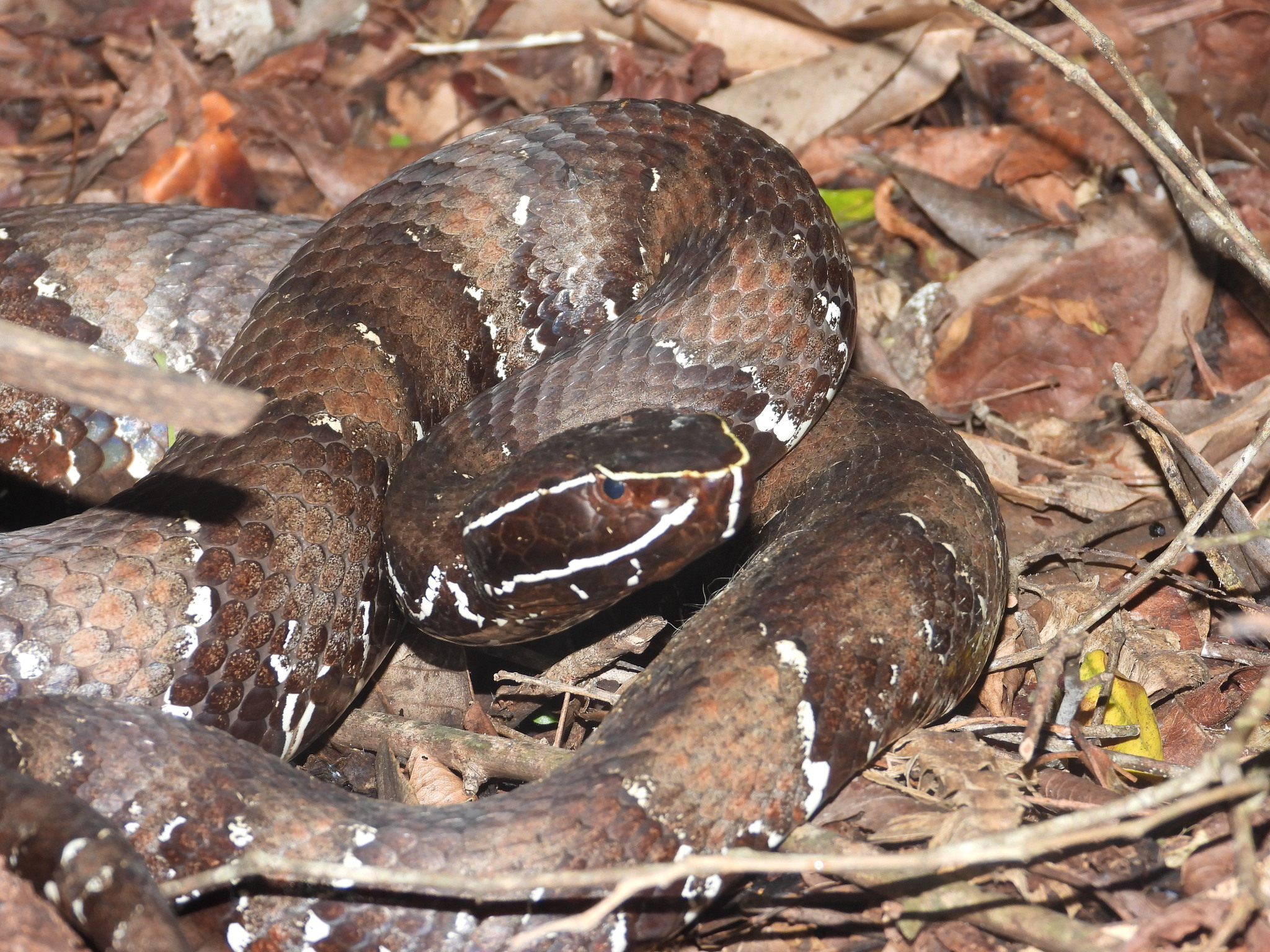
Yucatán, Mexico

Adults of Agkistrodon russeolus may grow to a total length (tail included) of more than 100 cm (39 in). Gloyd and Conant (1990) reported that the largest specimens they saw were from Pisté, Yucatán: a male of 105 cm (41 in) with a missing tail tip and a female of 101 cm (40 in). The average tail length is 19.2% of total body length in males and 16% in females.

Scalation includes 23 rows of keeled dorsal scales at midbody; 131–141 ventral scales; and 46–62 subcaudal scales, most of which are paired, especially towards the tail tip.

The dorsal color pattern consists of light brown to deep reddish brown ground color overlaid with 12–18 broad brown or brownish crossbands. Laterally, these crossbands are more lightly colored in the center and usually contain one or two dark spots. The head is clearly marked on either side with two longitudinal light lines: the upper one is narrow and may be broken behind to the eye, while the lower one is wider and separated from the commissure by a dark band.

== Common names ==
Mayan names for Agkistrodon russeolus are wol-poch and uol-poch.

== Geographic range ==
Agkistrodon russeolus occurs on the Yucatán Peninsula. The type locality is "11.7 km north of Pisté, Yucatán, Mexico." The majority of records are from the semi-arid northern regions of the peninsula in the state of Yucatán, Mexico. However, several additional records are scattered in the south at various isolated localities in the Mexican states of Campeche, Tabasco, the vicinity of the Quintana Roo and Belize border, and northern Guatemala. A number of reptiles from the Yucatán Peninsula fit this pattern of distribution, with continuous and unbroken records in the north, and several isolated and disjunct populations in the south.

== Habitat ==
The preferred natural habitat of Agkistrodon russeolus is forest. Northern areas of the Yucatán Peninsula support a predominantly low, deciduous scrub forest (Yucatán dry forests) with thin soils on a porous limestone karst landscape. Surface water is uncommon or absent in the region. The vegetation zones in the north have been characterized as tropical deciduous forest attaining heights of 20 m (66 ft) in some areas, and thorn forest 5–7 m (16–23 ft) high that is impenetrable in places in the far north. Southern regions of the peninsula, including much of the states of Quintana Roo, Campeche, northern Belize, and Guatemala (northern El Petén) sustain tropical evergreen forest averaging 25–30 m (82–98 ft) high. The canopy may be closed in some areas with a dense understory of vines and shrubs or more open in other areas allowing light to the ground.
