= Red snake =

Red snake may refer to:

- Agkistrodon contortrix, a.k.a. the southern copperhead, a venomous pitviper found in the United States
- Agkistrodon contortrix mokasen, a.k.a. the northern copperhead, a venomous pitviper found in the United States
- Heterodon platirhinos, a.k.a. the eastern hog-nosed snake, a harmless colubrid found in the United States
- Great Wall of Gorgan, a historical defensive wall in Iran, also known as "the Red Snake"
