= White oak snake =

White oak snake may refer to:

- Agkistrodon contortrix contortrix, a.k.a. the southern copperhead, a venomous viper subspecies found in the southeastern United States
- Agkistrodon contortrix mokasen, a.k.a. the northern copperhead, a venomous viper subspecies found in the northeastern United States
