= Deaf adder =

Deaf adder may refer to:

- Acanthopis, commonly known as death adders (and historically as deaf adders), a genus of highly venomous elapids found in Australia
- Agkistrodon contortrix mokasen, a.k.a. the northern copperhead, a venomous viper species also found in the United States
- Anguis fragilis, a.k.a. slow worm
- Heterodon platirhinos, a.k.a. the eastern hognose snake, a harmless species found the United States
