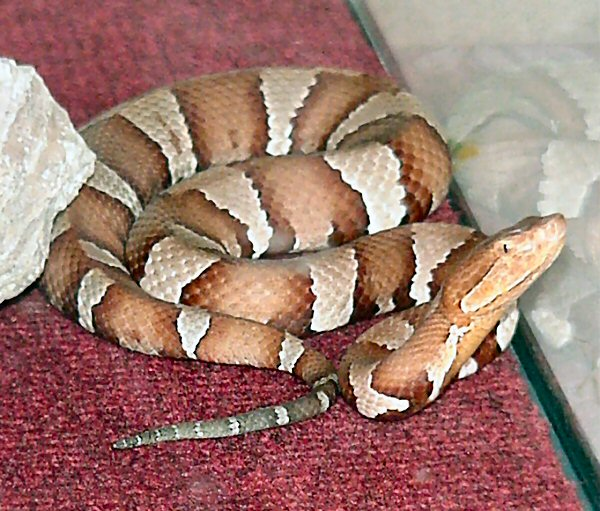

Scientific classification
- Kingdom: Animalia
- Phylum: Chordata
- Order: Squamata
- Suborder: Serpentes
- Family: Viperidae
- Genus: Agkistrodon
- Species: A. contortrix
- Subspecies: A. c. pictigaster

Trinomial name
- Agkistrodon contortrix pictigaster Gloyd & Conant, 1943

Synonyms
- Agkistrodon mokeson pictigaster Gloyd & Conant, 1943; Agkistrodon contortrix pictigaster – Klauber, 1948; Ancistrodon contortrix pictigaster – Schmidt, 1953

= Agkistrodon contortrix pictigaster =

Subspecies of snake

Common names: Trans-Pecos copperhead, western copperhead

Agkistrodon contortrix pictigaster was formerly a venomous pit viper subspecies found in the Trans-Pecos region of the United States in western Texas, and northeastern Mexico. However, recent taxonomic changes do not recognize the Trans-Pecos copperhead (A. c. pictigaster) as a valid taxon.

== New Taxonomy ==
The Trans-Pecos copperhead (Agkistrodon contortrix pictigaster) was once classified as a subspecies of the copperhead (Agkistrodon contortrix). However, DNA based studies published in 2008 and 2015, revealed no significant genetic difference between the Trans-Pecos copperhead (Agkistrodon contortrix pictigaster) and the broad-banded copperhead, (Agkistrodon contortrix laticinctus). The two subspecies were synonymized and elevated to full species, with the oldest published name, Agkistrodon laticinctus, having priority. The resulting taxonomy does not recognize the Trans-Pecos copperhead (Agkistrodon contortrix pictigaster) as a valid taxon. Several subsequent reviews and species accounts have followed and supported the revised taxonomy. Information on this snake can be found in the Agkistrodon laticinctus article.

== Description ==
This subspecies is typically a light tan in color, with darker brown, wide crossbands. Their actual color varies by locality, varying from a red-brown, to a gray-brown. The species can be difficult to distinguish from the broad-banded copperhead, A. c. laticinctus. The only notable physical difference between the subspecies is that the Trans-Pecos copperhead tends to have an elaborately patterned underside, often being an irregular, white and black pattern whereas the broad-banded tends to be plain white, only have minimal patterning, or have elongated random blotching instead of a distinct pattern. The subspecies intergrade where their ranges overlap, further confusing identification. It is easily distinguished from other subspecies of copperhead, in that other species typically have banding that narrows at the spine, creating hourglass shapes, whereas A. c. pictigaster has bands that do not narrow at the spine. They grow to approximately 20-36 inches (50–90 cm) in length. As juveniles, all species of Agkistrodon have a bright green-yellow color to their tail tip believed to be used as a lure to attract prey items to approach within striking range. The color fades to a grey or brown at about a year of age.

== Behavior ==
Like all A. contortrix subspecies, A. c. pictigaster is a nocturnal ambush predator. Their diet consists of primarily lizards, frogs, and rodents. Their choice of habitat is the driest among the copperhead subspecies, preferring rocky, lightly vegetated, canyon areas. They are ovoviviparous, giving birth to a litter of up to 8 young in the early fall.

== Venom ==
Like most pit viper species, A. contortrix has a hemotoxic venom, which is delivered through hinged, hollow fangs set in the front of their jaw. The fangs work like hypodermic needles, injecting the venom in a single, quick striking motion. Copperhead venom is not considered to be life-threatening to an otherwise healthy adult, but it can cause localized swelling, necrosis, and severe pain. Any bite from a venomous snake should be considered serious and medical treatment sought. There is no antivenin specifically manufactured for copperheads, but CroFab, which makes use of the venom from the cottonmouth (Agkistrodon piscivorus), can be used in cases of a severe envenomation.
