= Fibrolase =

Identifiers
- EC no.: 3.4.24.72
- CAS no.: 116036-70-5

Databases
- IntEnz: IntEnz view
- BRENDA: BRENDA entry
- ExPASy: NiceZyme view
- KEGG: KEGG entry
- MetaCyc: metabolic pathway
- PRIAM: profile
- PDB structures: RCSB PDB PDBe PDBsum
Search
- PMC: articles
- PubMed: articles
- NCBI: proteins

Fibrolase (EC 3.4.24.72, fibrinolytic proteinase, Agkistrodon contortrix contortrix metalloproteinase, Agkistrodon contortrix contortrix venom metalloproteinase) is an enzyme. This enzyme catalyses the following chemical reaction

Hydrolysis of -Ala^{14}-Leu- in insulin B chain and -Lys^{413}-Leu- in alpha-chain of fibrinogen

This enzyme is present in the venom of the southern copperhead snake (Agkistrodon contortrix contortrix).
