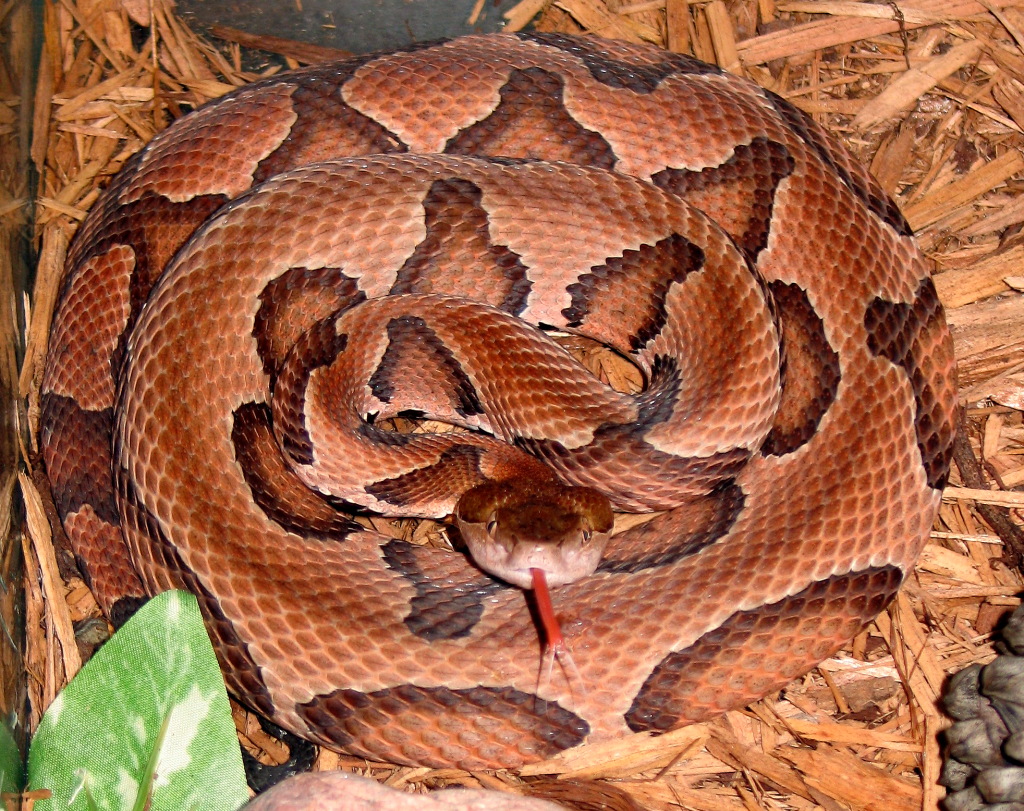
- Eastern copperhead, Agkistrodon contortrix

Scientific classification
- Kingdom: Animalia
- Phylum: Chordata
- Class: Reptilia
- Order: Squamata
- Suborder: Serpentes
- Family: Viperidae
- Subfamily: Crotalinae
- Genus: Agkistrodon; Palisot de Beauvois, 1799

Synonyms
- Agkistrodon Palisot de Beauvois, 1799; Agkishodon Palisot de Beauvois, 1799; Scytale Latreille In Sonnini & Latreille, 1801; Cenchris Daudin, 1803; Cenchrus Link, 1807; Scytalus Fischer, 1813; Tisiphone Fitzinger, 1826; Ancistrodon Wagler, 1830; Acontias Troost, 1836; Toxicophis Troost, 1836

= Agkistrodon =

Agkistrodon Temporal range: Miocene - present

Genus of snakes

Agkistrodon is a genus of pit vipers commonly known as American moccasins. The genus is endemic to North America, ranging from the northeastern United States to northern Costa Rica. Eight species are recognized as being valid, all of them monotypic and closely related. Common names include: cottonmouths, copperheads, and cantils.

== Name origin ==
The name Agkistrodon comes from the Greek words ankistron (ἄγκιστρον, 'fishhook', with the irregular transliteration gk rather than the usual nk) and odon (ὀδών) 'tooth' and is likely a reference to the fangs.

Some varieties of the genus are given the common name "moccasin" or "moccasin snake" in the United States, which is the Algonquian word for "shoe". The origin of this nickname is unknown. The first known use of "moccasin" to refer to a deadly venomous snake was in a 1765 publication. The nickname is used to refer to both cottonmouths and copperheads. According to the Word Detective, this use may be related to their color and appearance or the silence with which they move. Another source for this name may be the Native American word "mokesoji" of unknown origin and meaning.

== Description ==
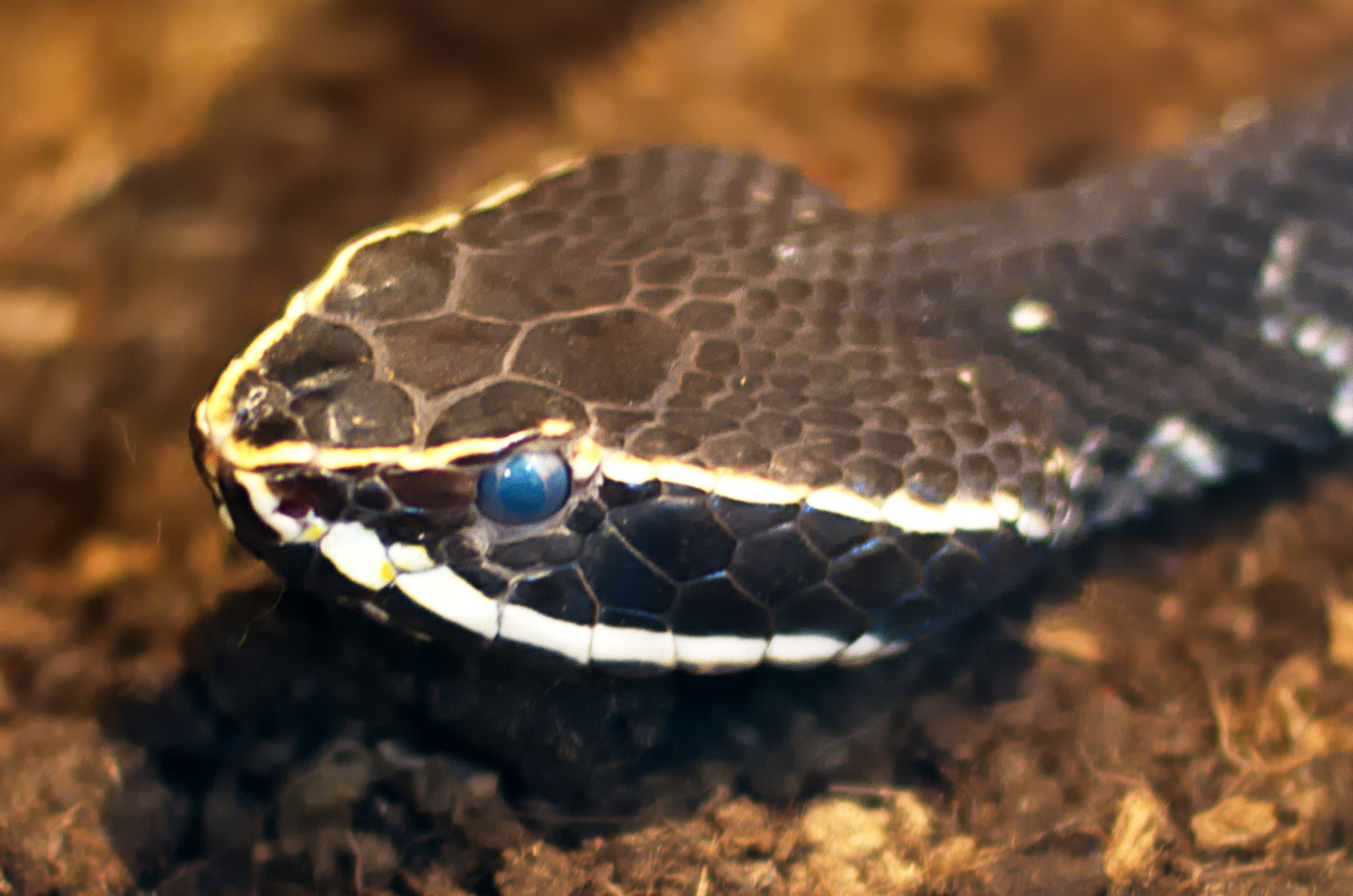
Agkistrodon bilineatus showing the large symmetrical platelike scales on the crown of the head that are characteristic of all species in the genus. The hazy blue eyes are typical of snakes that will soon shed their skin.

Members of the genus Agkistrodon have a number of features in common. All species have a relatively broad head with short fangs. A loreal scale is present, except in A. piscivorus. Usually, nine large symmetrical platelike scales are on the crown of the head, but in all species, these are often irregularly fragmented or have sutures, especially in A. bilineatus. All have a sharply defined canthus rostralis and a vertically elliptical pupil. Usually eight (6–10) supralabial scales and usually 10–11 (8–13) sublabials are present. The dorsal scales are mostly keeled and at midbody number 21–25 (usually 23), while A. piscivorus has 23–27 (usually 25). The snake has 127–157 ventral scales and 36–71 subcaudals. Of the latter, some may be divided. The anal scale is single. All have a color pattern of 10–20 dark crossbands on a lighter ground color, although sometimes the crossbands are staggered as half bands on either side of the body.

The phylogeny of the species has long been controversial. Studies based on morphological and venom characteristics support the idea that A. bilineatus and A. contortrix are more closely related. However, an analysis of mitochondrial DNA, as well as more recent molecular studies, have concluded that A. bilineatus and A. piscivorus are sister taxa, with A. contortrix being a sister species to them both.

== Geographic range ==
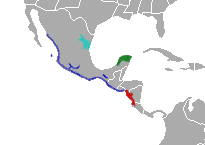
General distribution of four Latin American species: dark blue = A. bilineatus; red = A. howardgloydi; green = A. russeolus; light blue = A. taylori.

Agkistrodon species are found in North America from the northeastern and central United States southward through peninsular Florida and southwestern Texas, and in Central America on the Atlantic versant from Tamaulipas and Nuevo León southward to the Yucatan Peninsula, Belize, and Guatemala. They are seen along the Pacific coastal plain and lower foothills from Sonora south through Guatemala, El Salvador, Honduras, and Nicaragua to northwestern Costa Rica.

== Behavior ==
All Agkistrodon species are semiaquatic to terrestrial and are often found near sources of water. However, A. contortrix and A. bilineatus are also found in dry habitats, often far from permanent streams or ponds.

== Reproduction ==
The members of the genus Agkistrodon are all ovoviviparous.

A 2012 study found that they are not only capable of parthenogenesis (asexual reproduction), but that litters created without a male may account for up to 5% of litters in the wild, even in areas that have males present. This phenomenon had previously only been observed in captive populations.

== Venom ==
Pit vipers of the genus Agkistrodon rely on a potent venom to immobilize prey and fend off predators. One bite can inject enough venom into a human to cause severe pain, swelling, weakness, difficulty breathing, hemorrhaging, gangrene, fever, vomiting, and in rare instances, even death.

The venom of all species is assumed to be not unlike that of A. contortrix, which contains thrombin-like enzymes that act upon the coagulant activity of the blood. A study of electrophoretic patterns of proteins in venoms among and within populations of A. contortrix and A. piscivorus showed that substantial variation exists, and no reason exists to believe that these differences do not correspond with variations in toxicity.

=== Research ===
In a study conducted at the College of Medicine at the University of Florida, venom from Agkistrodon piscivorous was injected into the lymph fluid of a frog. The frog immediately suffocated because of the collapse of its lung sacs. The venom even resulted in lung constriction when directly applied to the surface of the frog's lungs. To test this, trace amounts of venom were dropped onto a single pulmonary sac in a frog's lung after it was anesthetized and its chest cavity dissected open. A drop of solution containing a venom concentration of 1 mg/ml was enough to cause contraction of the pulmonary artery adventitia after 5–8 sec in a frog weighing 40 g (1.4 oz). The study found, however, that this toxic effect is simply a tool the snake can choose to employ from an accessory venom gland it has. In most instances, the viper injects a venom that tends to immobilize, not kill, its prey before ingestion. In this case, the main venom glands secrete a toxin that inhibits the prey's sympathetic response to flee or fend off its predator. This essentially stuns the animal so that the predator can easily attack.

== Species ==
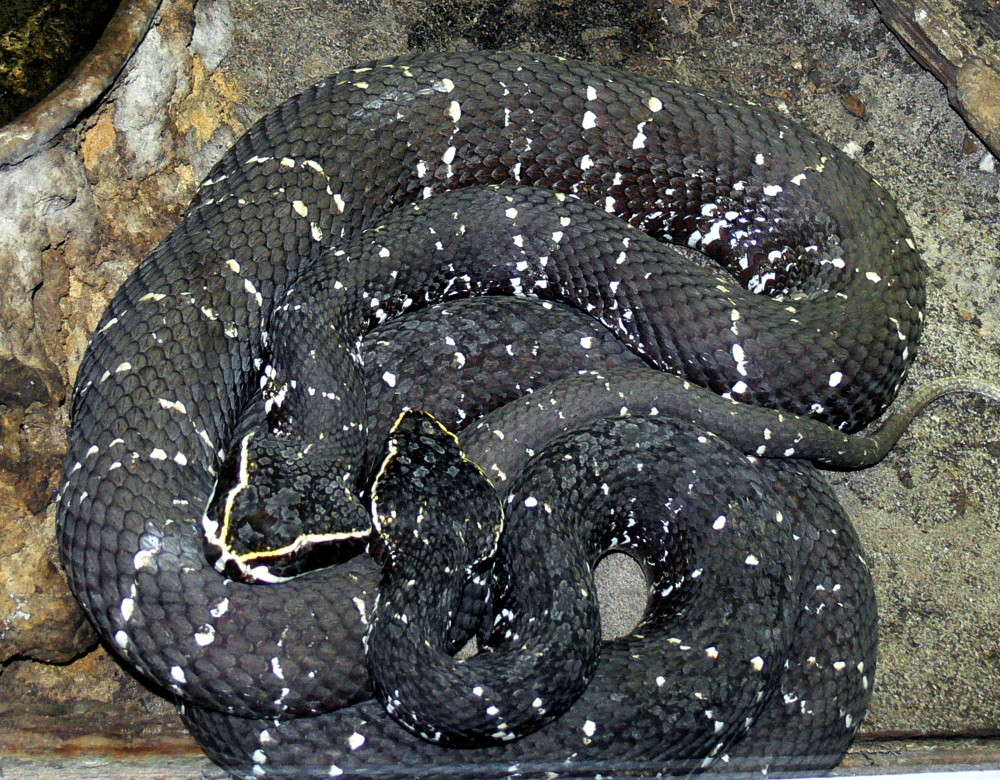
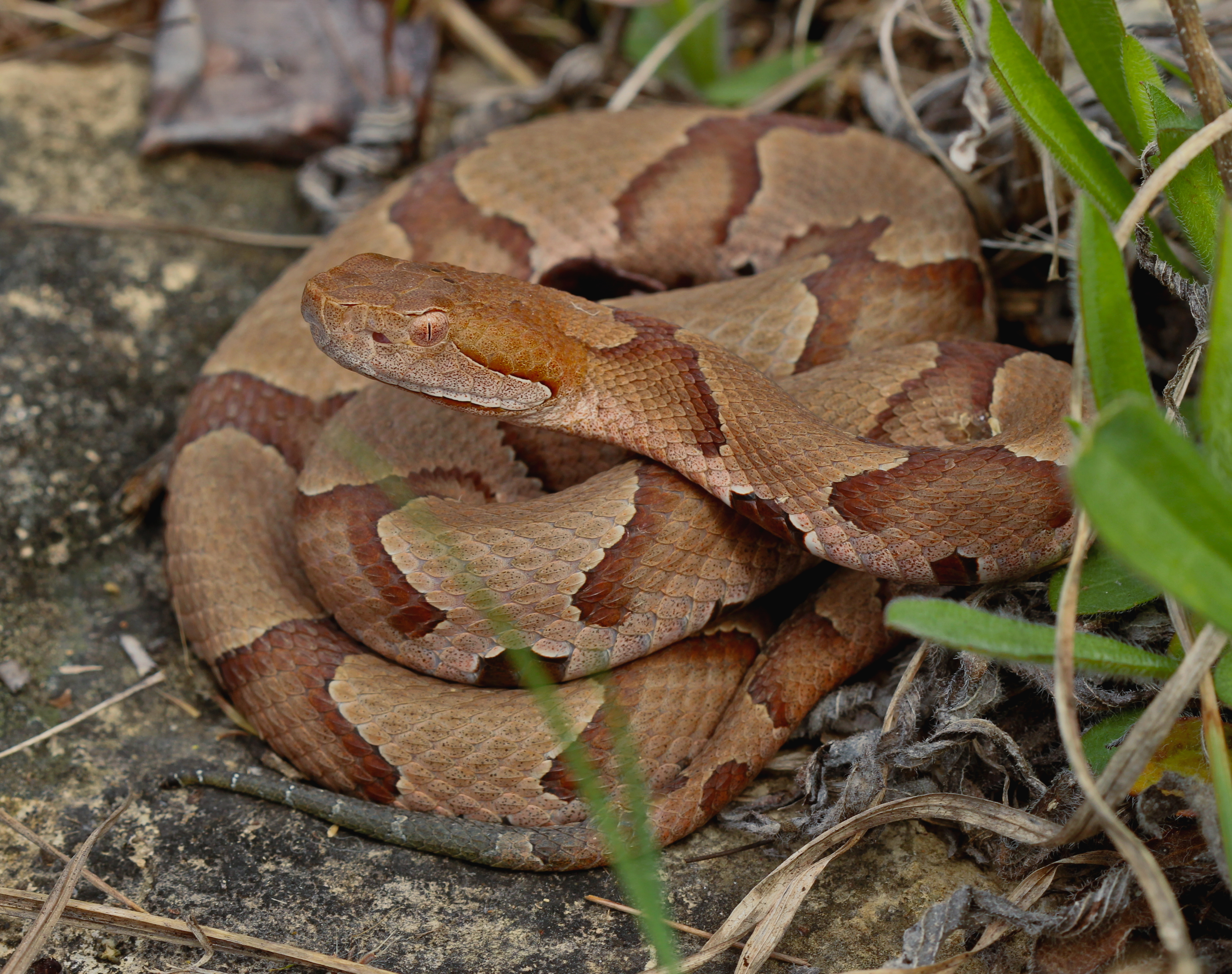
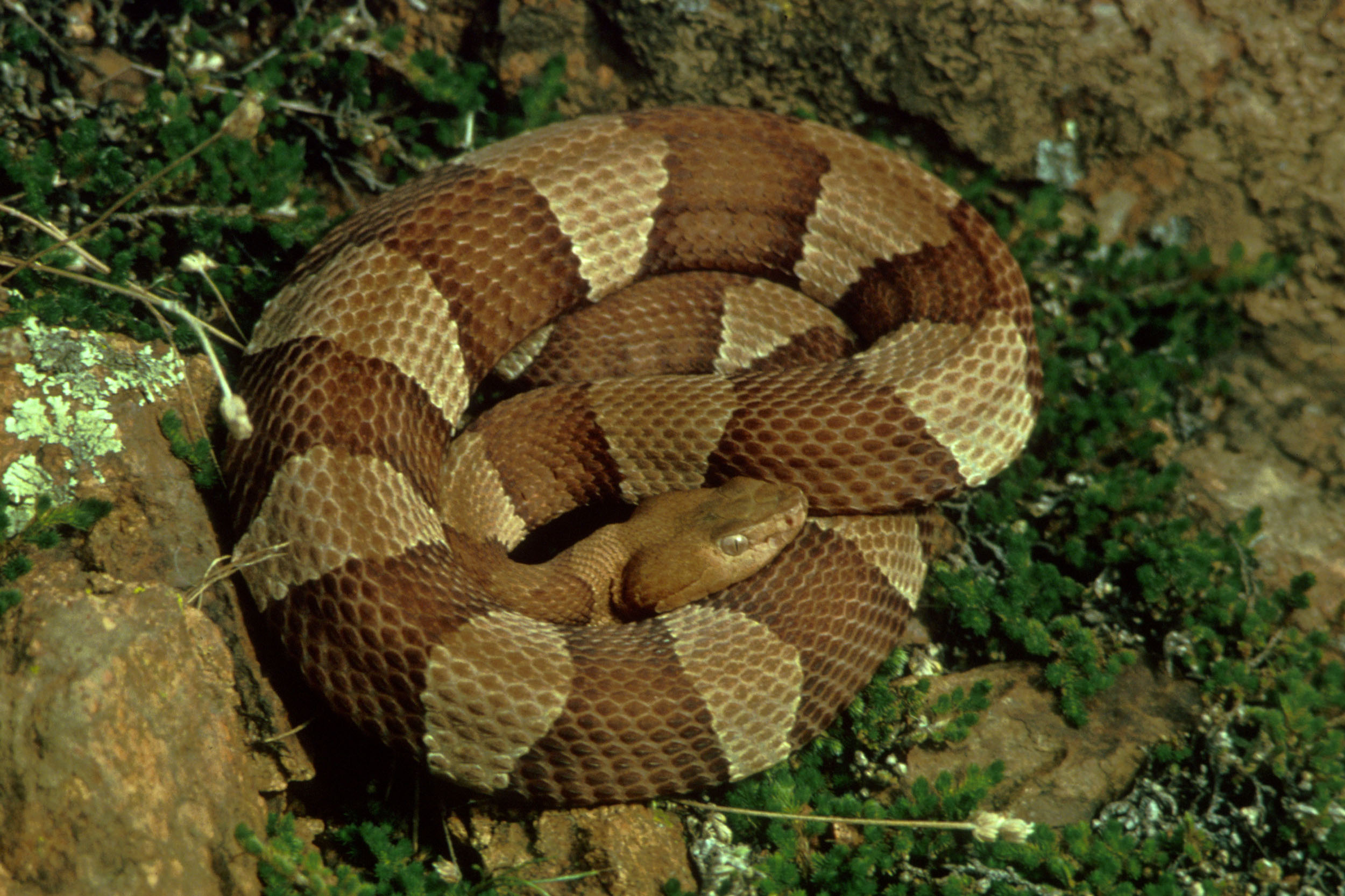
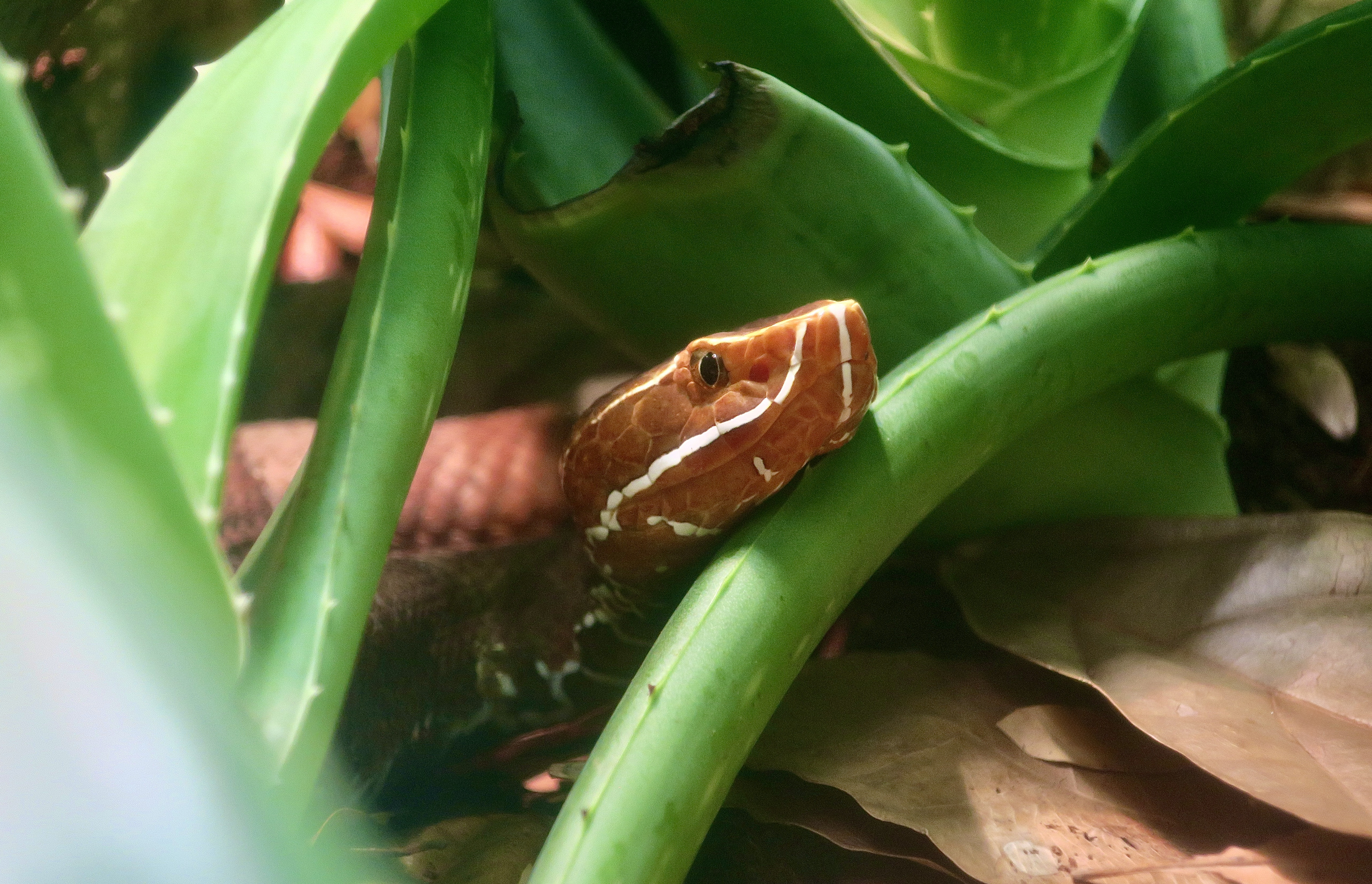
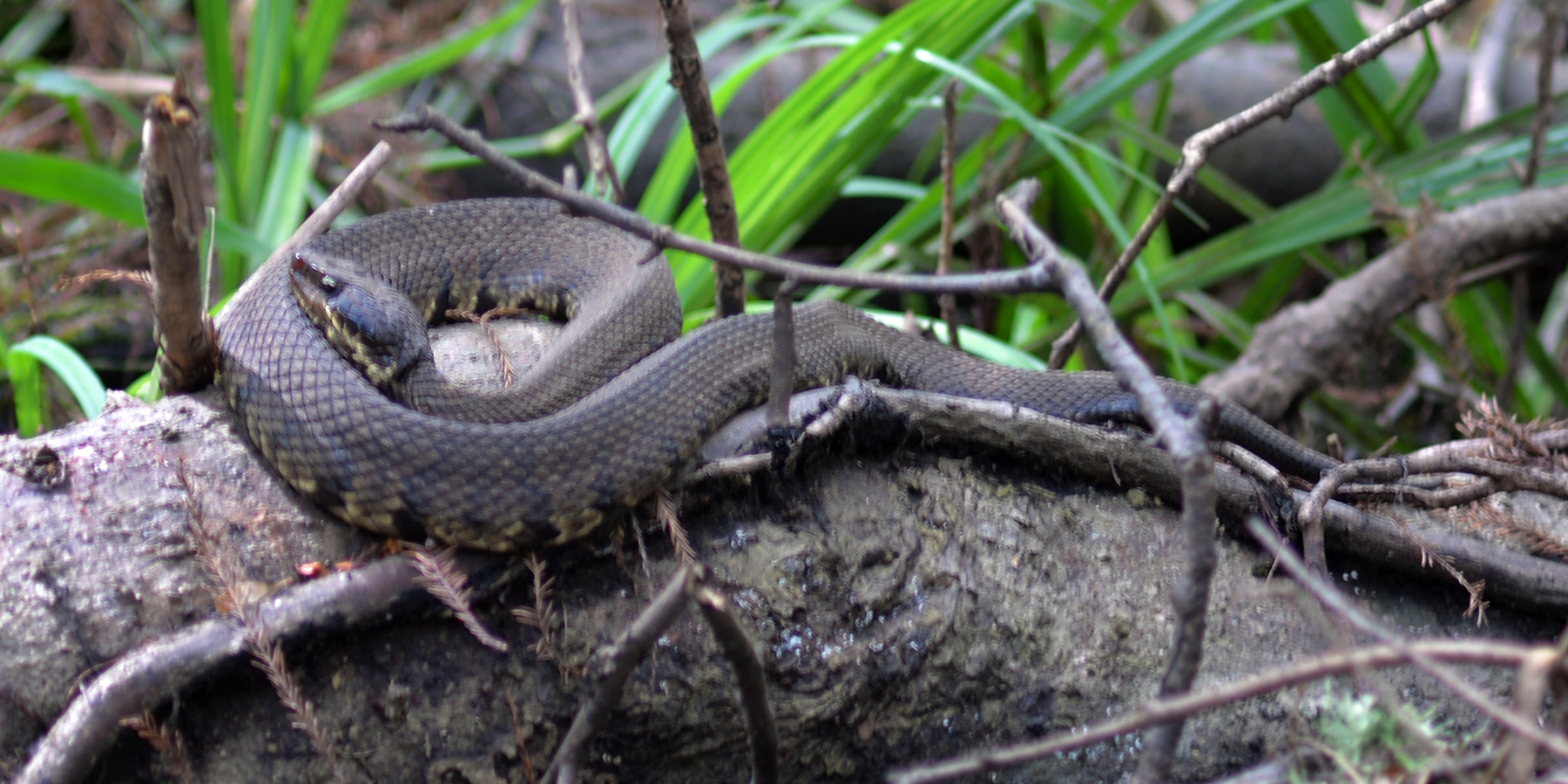
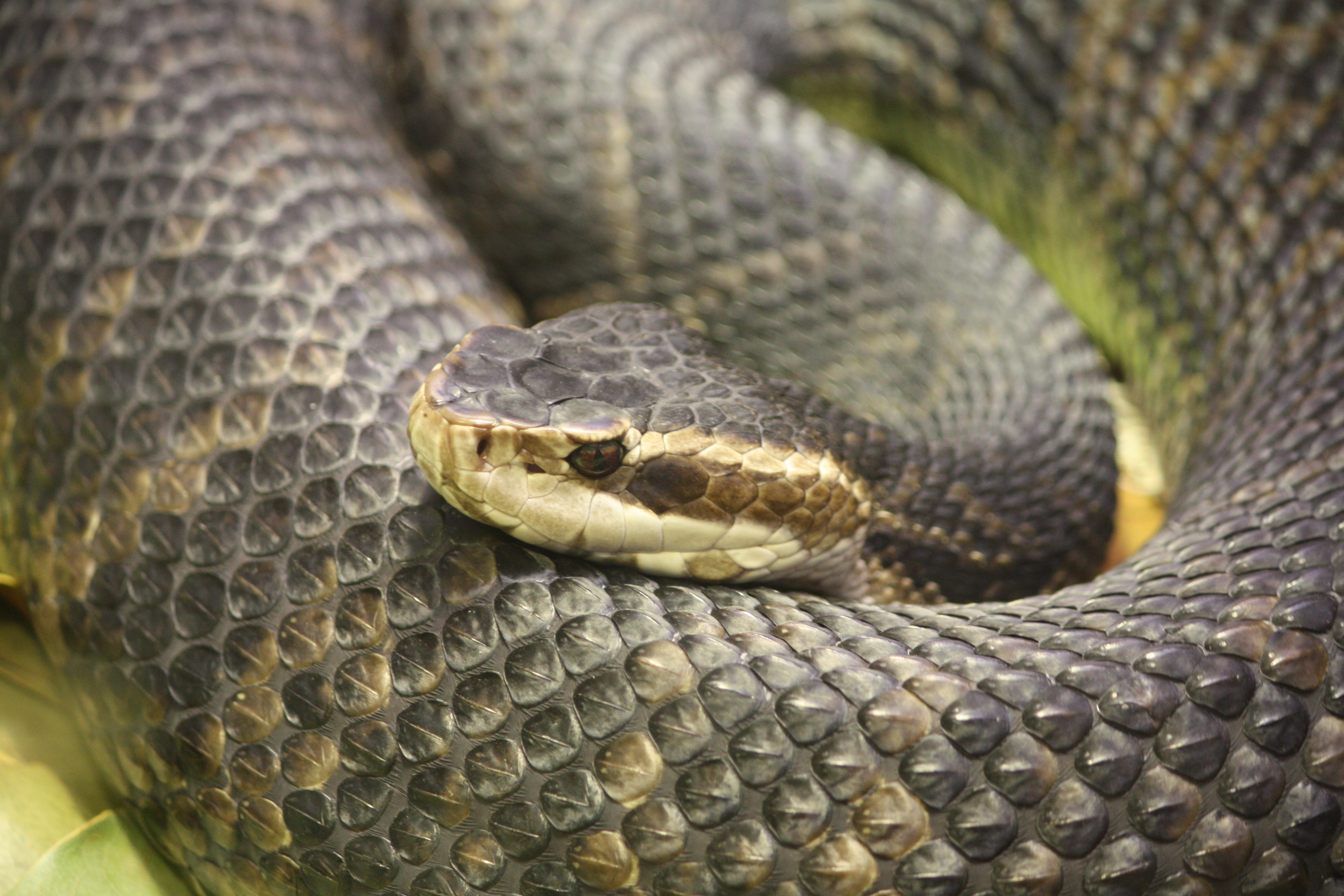
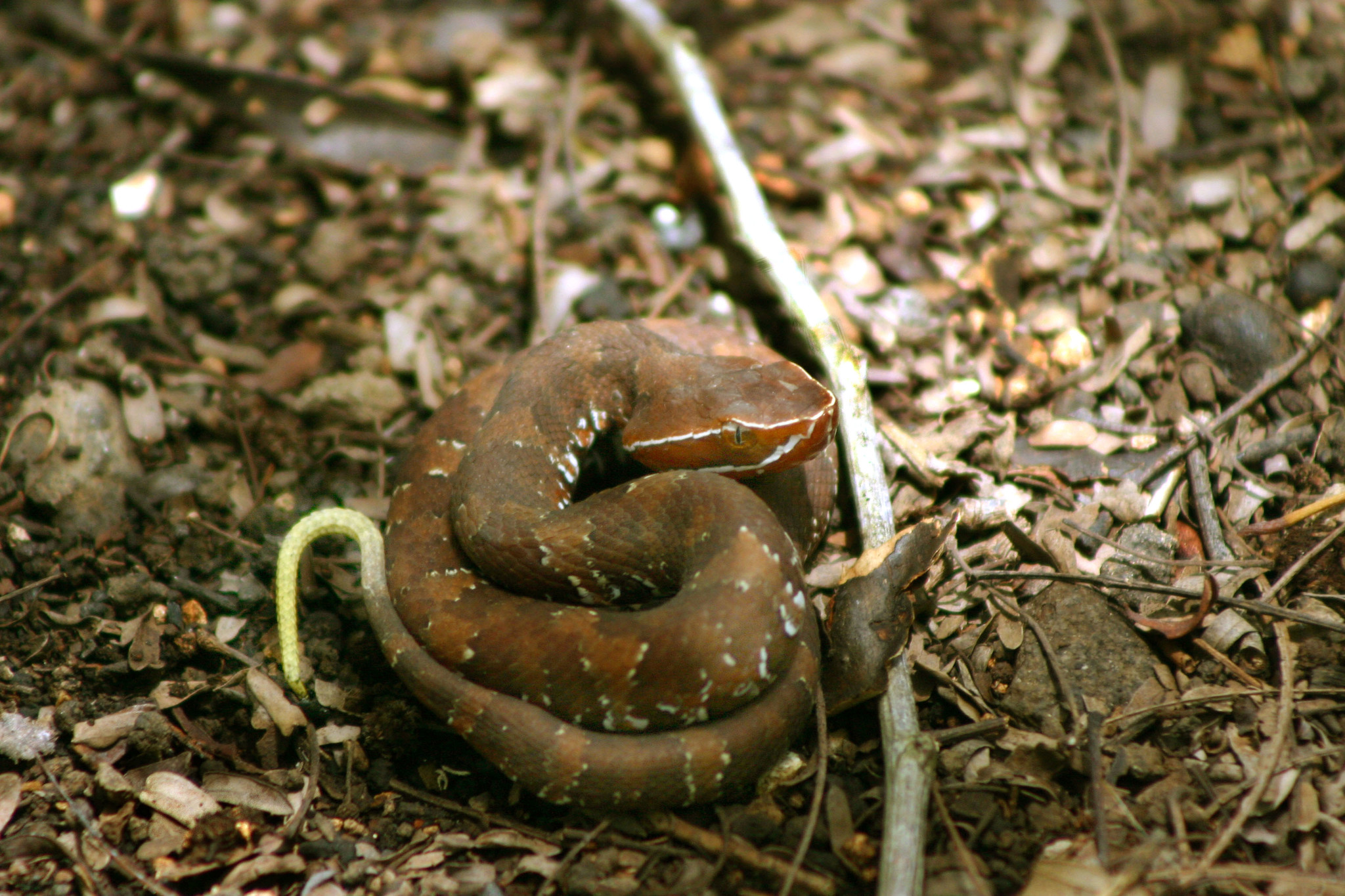
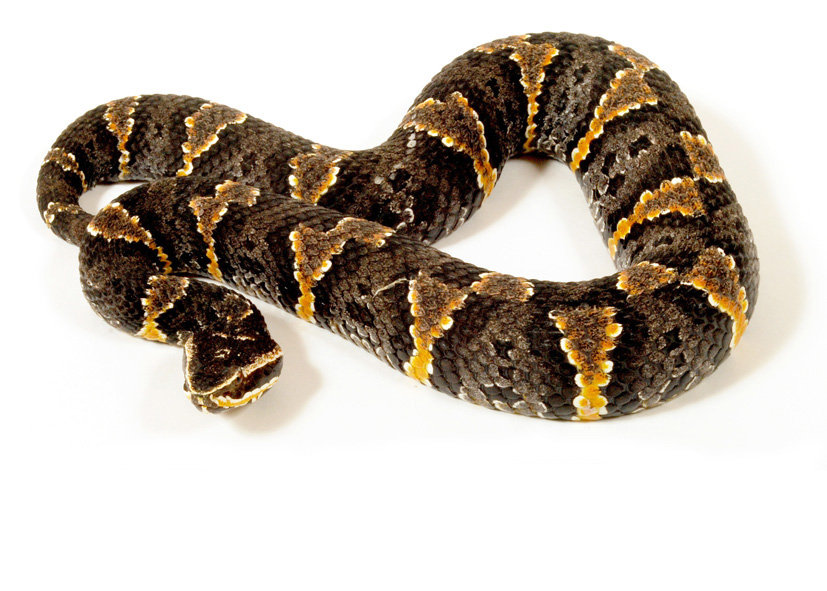
Image	Species and author	Common name	Geographic range
	A. bilineatus (Günther, 1863)	cantil	Mexico and Central America, from southern Sonora, Mexico south to Guatemala, El Salvador, and Honduras.
	A. contortrix^{T} (Linnaeus, 1766)	eastern copperhead	The United States (East Texas, Oklahoma, and Kansas, eastward to the Atlantic coast, including Missouri, Arkansas, Louisiana, Mississippi, Alabama, Georgia, northern Florida, South Carolina, North Carolina, Tennessee, Kentucky, Virginia, West Virginia, Illinois, Indiana, Ohio, Iowa, Pennsylvania, Maryland, New Jersey, Delaware, New York, Connecticut, Massachusetts).
	A. laticinctus Gloyd & Conant, 1934	broad-banded copperhead	Eastern Kansas, central Oklahoma, central and Trans-Pecos Texas, and adjacent areas of northern Chihuahua and Coahuila, Mexico.
	A. howardgloydi Conant, 1984	Gloyd's moccasin	Northwestern Costa Rica, western Nicaragua, southern Honduras.
	A. piscivorus (Lacépède, 1798)	northern cottonmouth	The eastern United States from extreme southeastern Virginia, south through peninsular Florida and west to Arkansas, southeastern Kansas, eastern and southern Oklahoma and eastern and central Texas. A few records exist from along the Rio Grande in Texas, but these are thought to represent isolated populations that possibly no longer exist.
	A. conanti Gloyd, 1969	Florida cottonmouth	Southernmost Georgia through Florida.
	A. russeolus Gloyd, 1972	Yucatecan cantil	Yucatan, Mexico, northern Guatemala, northern Belize.
	A. taylori Burger & Robertson, 1951	Taylor's cantil	Gulf Coast lowlands of northeast Mexico, primarily southern Tamaulipas, with a few records from adjacent areas of Nuevo Leon, San Luis Potosi, Veracruz, and Hidalgo.

^{T} Type species.

== Taxonomy ==
This genus was previously much larger and also included the following genera:

- Calloselasma – ground pit viper found in Southeast Asia (Malaya).
- Deinagkistrodon – the hundred-pace viper found mostly in southern China.
- Gloydius – ground pit vipers found in Asia.
- Hypnale – hump-nosed vipers found in India and Sri Lanka.
