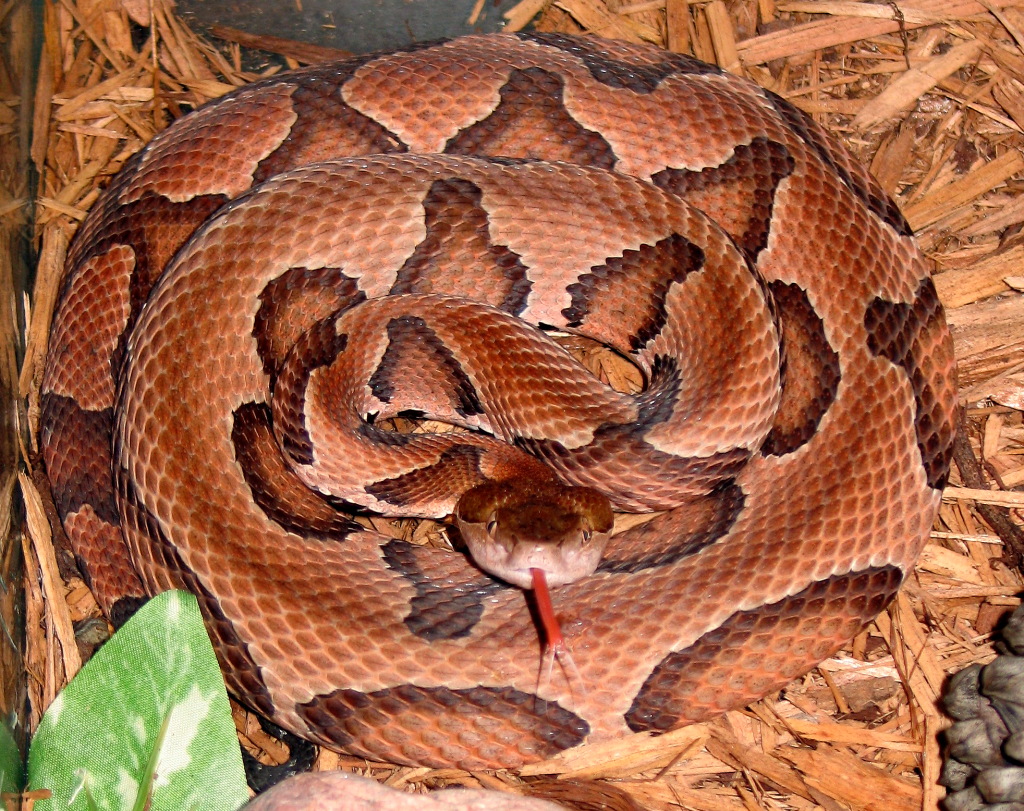

Conservation status
- Least Concern (IUCN 3.1)

Scientific classification
- Kingdom: Animalia
- Phylum: Chordata
- Class: Reptilia
- Order: Squamata
- Suborder: Serpentes
- Family: Viperidae
- Genus: Agkistrodon
- Species: A. contortrix

Binomial name
- Agkistrodon contortrix (Linnaeus, 1766)
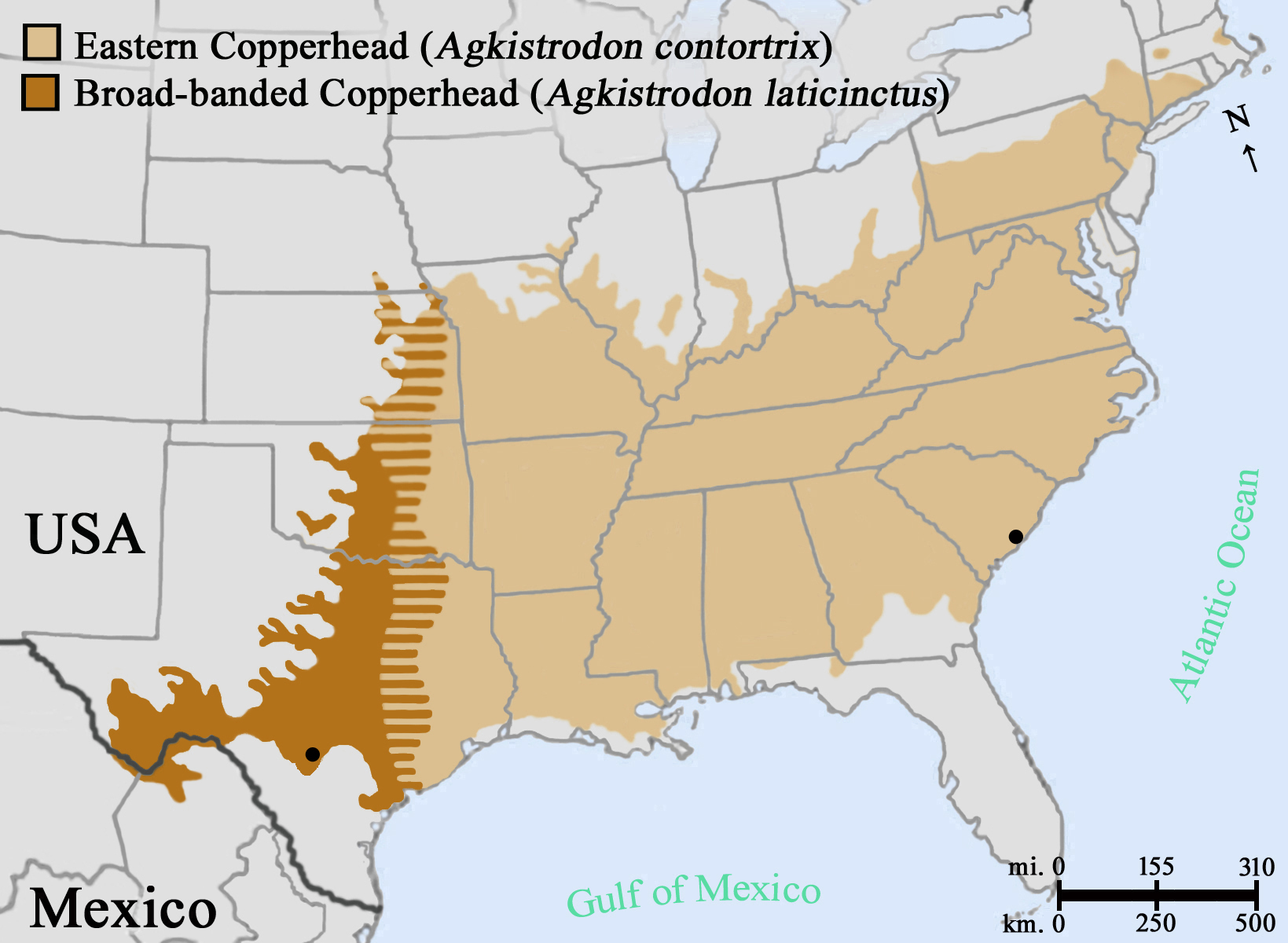

Synonyms
- List: Boa contortrix Linnaeus, 1766; Scytale contortrix — Sonnini & Latreille, 1801; Scytale Cupreus Rafinesque, 1818; Scytale cupreus — Say, 1819; Tisiphone cuprea — Fitzinger, 1826; [Cenchris] marmorata F. Boie, 1827; Acontias atrofuscus Troost, 1836; [Toxicophis atrofuscus] — Troost, 1836; T[rigonocephalus] cenchris Schlegel, 1837; Trigonocephalus Contortrix — Holbrook, 1838; Trigonocephalus atro-fuscus — Holbrook, 1842; Cenchris contortrix — Gray, 1842; Cenchris atrofuscus — Gray, 1849; Agkistrodon contortrix — Baird & Girard, 1853; T[rigonocephalus] histrionicus A.M.C. Duméril & Bibron, 1853; Ancistrodon contortrix — Baird, 1854; Agkistrodon contorting Abbott, 1869 (ex errore); Ancistrodon atrofuscus — Cope, 1875; Agkistrodon atrofuscus — Yarrow, 1882; [Ancistrodon contortrix] Var. atrofuscus — Garman, 1884; Ancistrodon contortrix — Boulenger, 1896; Agkistrodon contortirix Keim, 1914 (ex errore); Agkistrodon mokasen cupreus — Gloyd & Conant, 1938; Agkistrodon contortrix contortrix — Klauber, 1967; Ancistrodon contortrix contortrix — Schmidt, 1953

= Eastern copperhead =

Species of reptile

The eastern copperhead (Agkistrodon contortrix), also known simply as the copperhead, is a widespread species of venomous snake, a pit viper, endemic to eastern United States of America; it is a member of the subfamily Crotalinae in the family Viperidae.

The eastern copperhead has distinctive, dark brown, hourglass-shaped markings, overlaid on a light reddish brown or brown/gray background. The body type is heavy, rather than slender. Neonates are born with green or yellow tail tips, which progress to a darker brown or black within one year. Adults grow to a typical length (including tail) of 50–95 cm (20–37 in).

In most of the United States of America, the eastern copperhead favors deciduous forest and mixed woodlands. It may occupy rock outcroppings and ledges, but is also found in low-lying, swampy regions. During the winter, it hibernates in dens or limestone crevices, often together with timber rattlesnakes and black rat snakes. The eastern copperhead is known to feed on a wide variety of prey, including invertebrates (primarily arthropods) and vertebrates. Like most pit vipers, the eastern copperhead is generally an ambush predator; it takes up a promising position and waits for suitable prey to arrive.

As a common species within its range, it may be encountered by humans. Unlike other viperids, it often "freezes" instead of slithering away and fleeing, due to its habit of relying on excellent camouflage. Bites occur due to people unknowingly stepping on or near them. Copperhead bites account for half of the treated snake bites in the United States.

Five subspecies have been recognized in the past, but recent genetic analysis has yielded new species information.

== Etymology ==
Its generic name is derived from the Greek words ankistron "hook, fishhook" and odon, variant of odous "tooth". The trivial name, or specific epithet, comes from the Latin contortus (twisted, intricate, complex), which is usually interpreted to reference the distorted pattern of darker bands across the snake's back, which are broad at the lateral base, but "pinched" into narrow hourglass shapes in the middle at the vertebral area.

== Description ==
Adults grow to a typical length (including tail) of 50–95 cm (20–37 in). Some may exceed 1 m (3 ft 3 in), although that is exceptional for this species. Males do not typically exceed 74 to 76 cm (29 to 30 in) and weigh from 101.5 to 343 g (3 9/16 to 12 1/8 oz), with a mean of roughly 197.4 g (6 15/16 oz). Females do not typically exceed 60 to 66 cm (23 1/2 to 26 in), and have a mean body mass of 119.8 g (4 7/32 oz). The maximum length reported for this species is 134.6 cm (53 in) for A. c. mokasen (Ditmars, 1931). Brimley (1944) mentions a specimen of A. c. mokasen from Chapel Hill, North Carolina, that was "four feet, six inches" (137.2 cm), but this may have been an approximation. The maximum length for A. c. contortrix is 132.1 cm (52 in) (Conant, 1958).

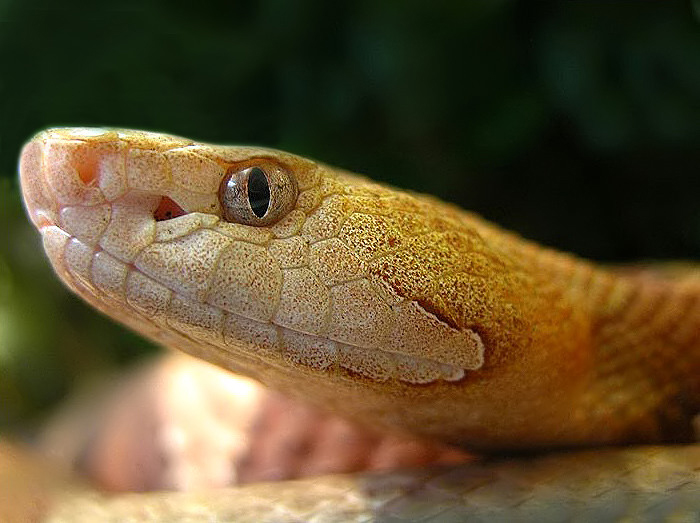
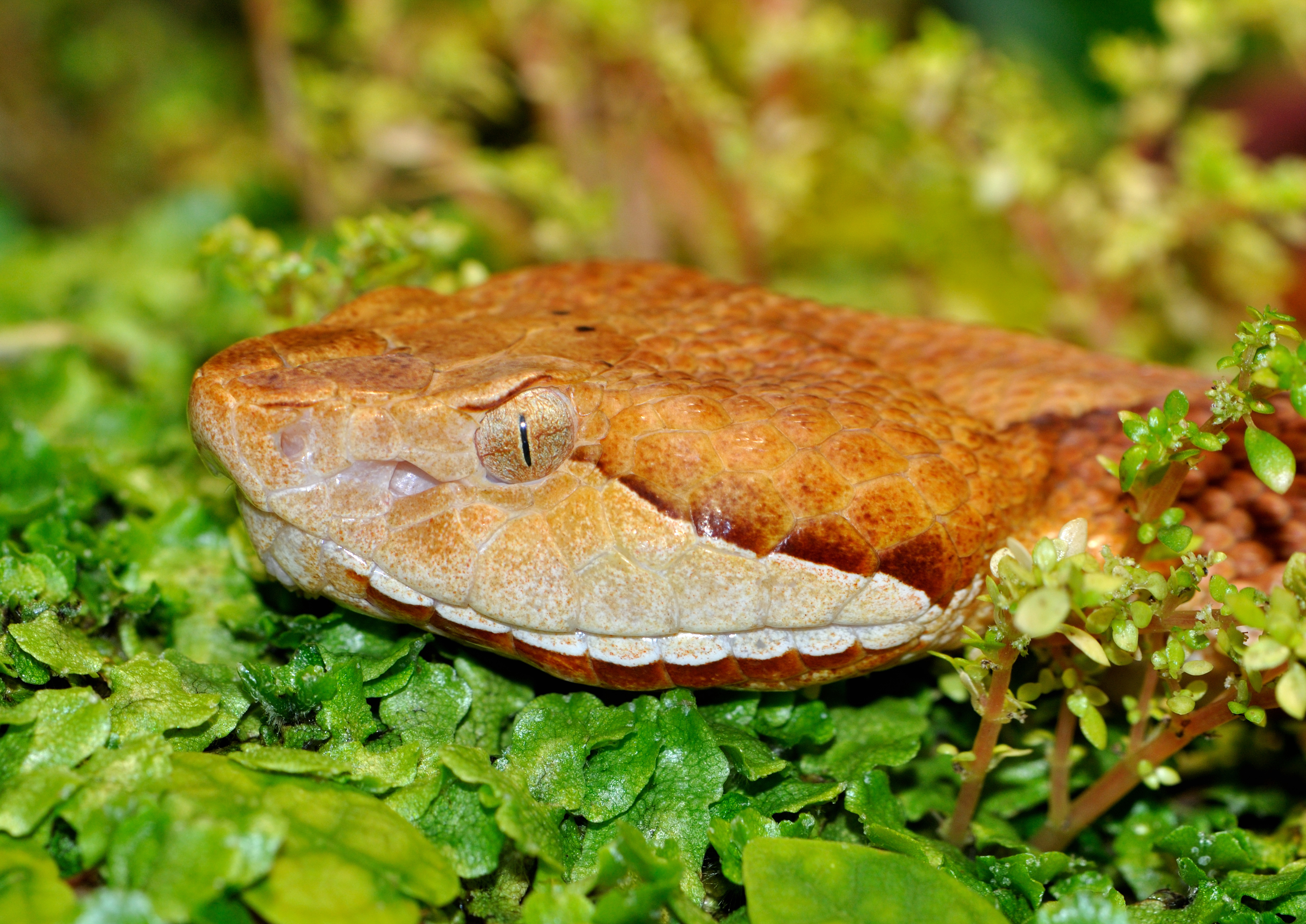
Head closeup, showing dilated and constricted pupils

The body is relatively stout and the head is broad and distinct from the neck. Because the snout slopes down and back, it appears less blunt than that of the cottonmouth, A. piscivorus. Consequently, the top of the head extends further forward than the mouth.

The escalation includes 21–25 (usually 23) rows of dorsal scales at midbody, 138–157 ventral scales in both sexes, and 38–62 and 37–57 subcaudal scales in males and females, respectively. The subcaudals are usually single, but the percentage thereof decreases clinally from the northeast, where about 80% are undivided, to the southwest of the geographic range where as little as 50% may be undivided. On the head are usually 9 large symmetrical plates, 6–10 (usually 8) supralabial scales, and 8–13 (usually 10) sublabial scales.

The color pattern consists of a pale tan to pinkish-tan ground color that becomes darker towards the foreline, overlaid with a series of 10–18 (13.4) crossbands. Characteristically, both the ground color and crossband pattern are pale in A. c. contortrix. These crossbands are light tan to pinkish-tan to pale brown in the center, but darker towards the edges. They are about two scales wide or less at the midline of the back, but expand to a width of 6–10 scales on the sides of the body. They do not extend down to the ventral scales. Often, the crossbands are divided at the midline and alternate on either side of the body, with some individuals even having more half bands than complete ones. A series of dark brown spots is also present on the flanks, next to the belly, and are largest and darkest in the spaces between the crossbands.

The belly is the same color as the ground color, but may be a little whitish in part. At the base of the tail are one to three (usually two) brown crossbands followed by a gray area. In juveniles, the pattern on the tail is more distinct: 7–9 crossbands are visible, while the tip is yellow. On the head, the crown is usually unmarked, except for a pair of small dark spots, one near the midline of each parietal scale. A faint postocular stripe is also present; diffuse above and bordered below by a narrow brown edge.

Several aberrant color patterns for A. c. contortrix, or populations that intergrade with it, have also been reported. In a specimen described by Livezey (1949) from Walker County, Texas, 11 of 17 crossbands were not joined middorsally, while on one side, three of the crossbands were fused together longitudinally to form a continuous, undulating band, surmounted above by a dark stripe that was 2.0–2.5 scales wide.

In another specimen, from Lowndes County, Alabama, the first three crossbands were complete, followed by a dark stripe that ran down either side of the body, with points of pigment reaching up to the midline in six places, but never getting there, after which the last four crossbands on the tail were also complete. A specimen found in Terrebonne Parish, Louisiana had a similar striped pattern, with only the first and last two crossbands being normal.

== Distribution and habitat ==
The eastern copperhead is found in North America; its range within the United States is in Alabama, Arkansas, Connecticut, Delaware, District of Columbia, Florida, Georgia, Illinois, Indiana, Iowa, Kansas, Kentucky, Louisiana, Maryland, Massachusetts, Mississippi, Missouri, Nebraska, New Jersey, New York, North Carolina, Ohio, Oklahoma, Pennsylvania, South Carolina, Tennessee, Texas, Virginia, and West Virginia. In Mexico, it occurs in Chihuahua and Coahuila. The type locality is "Carolina". Schmidt (1953) proposed the type locality be restricted to "Charleston, South Carolina".

Unlike some other species of North American pit vipers, such as the timber rattlesnake and massasauga, the copperhead has mostly not re-established itself north of the terminal moraine after the last glacial period (the Wisconsin glaciation), though it is found in southeastern New York and southern New England, north of the Wisconsin glaciation terminal moraine on Long Island.

Historically, kingsnakes have been major copperhead predators. Recent copperhead abundance has been linked to declining kingsnake populations in those areas.

Eastern copperheads are habitat generalists which are species able to survive in different habitats (fragmented and unfragmented). Within its range, it occupies a variety of different habitats. In most of North America, it favors deciduous forest and mixed woodlands. It is often associated with rock outcroppings and ledges, but is also found in low-lying, swampy regions. During the winter, it hibernates in dens or limestone crevices, often together with timber rattlesnakes and black rat snakes. In the states around the Gulf of Mexico, however, this species is also found in coniferous forest. In the Chihuahuan Desert of West Texas and northern Mexico, it occurs in riparian habitats, usually near permanent or semipermanent water and sometimes in dry arroyos (brooks). Habitat fragmentation has been found to impair Eastern Copperhead access to feeding, brumation, and reproduction sites. In a tracking study, copperheads studied in fragmented areas never left the area they were first caught in.

== Conservation status ==
This species is classified as least concern on the IUCN Red List of Threatened Species (v3.1, 2001). This means that relative to many other species, it is not at risk of extinction in the near future. The population trend was stable when assessed in 2007. Their venom has potential medicinal value to humans.

== Behavior ==
In the Southern United States, copperheads are nocturnal during the hot summer, but are commonly active during the day during the spring and fall. Unlike other viperids, they often "freeze" instead of slithering away, and as a result, many bites occur due to people unknowingly stepping on or near them. This tendency to freeze most likely evolved because of the extreme effectiveness of their camouflage. When lying on dead leaves or red clay, they can be almost impossible to notice. Eastern Copperheads are more likely to either remain in crypsis or flee in the presence of a human rather than display defensive behavior. Generally nonaggressive, will only strike if threatened as a last resort. Like most other New World vipers, copperheads exhibit defensive tail vibration behavior when closely approached. This species is capable of vibrating its tail in excess of 40 times per second— faster than almost any other non-rattlesnake snake species.

== Diet and feeding behavior ==
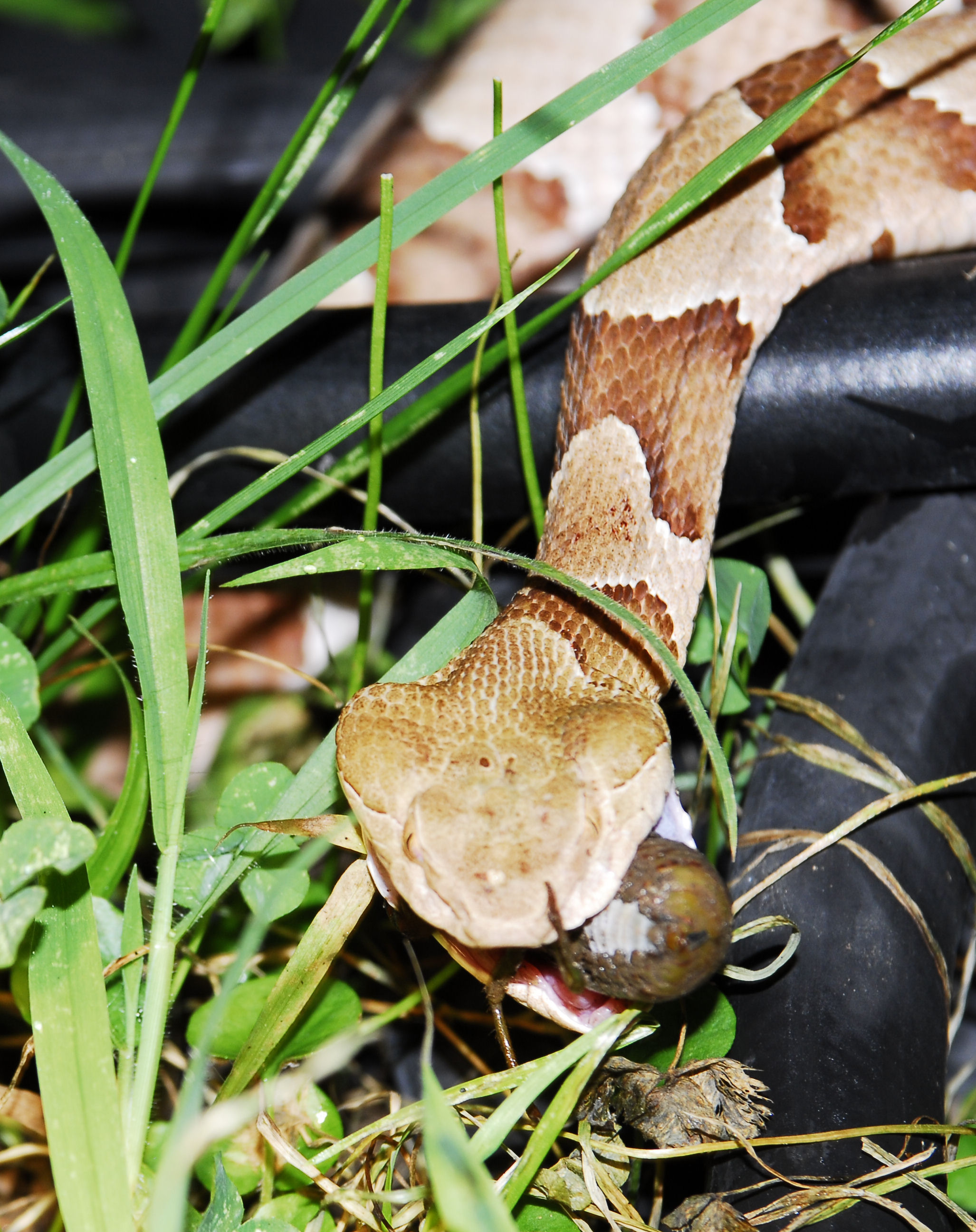
Copperhead swallowing a cicada.

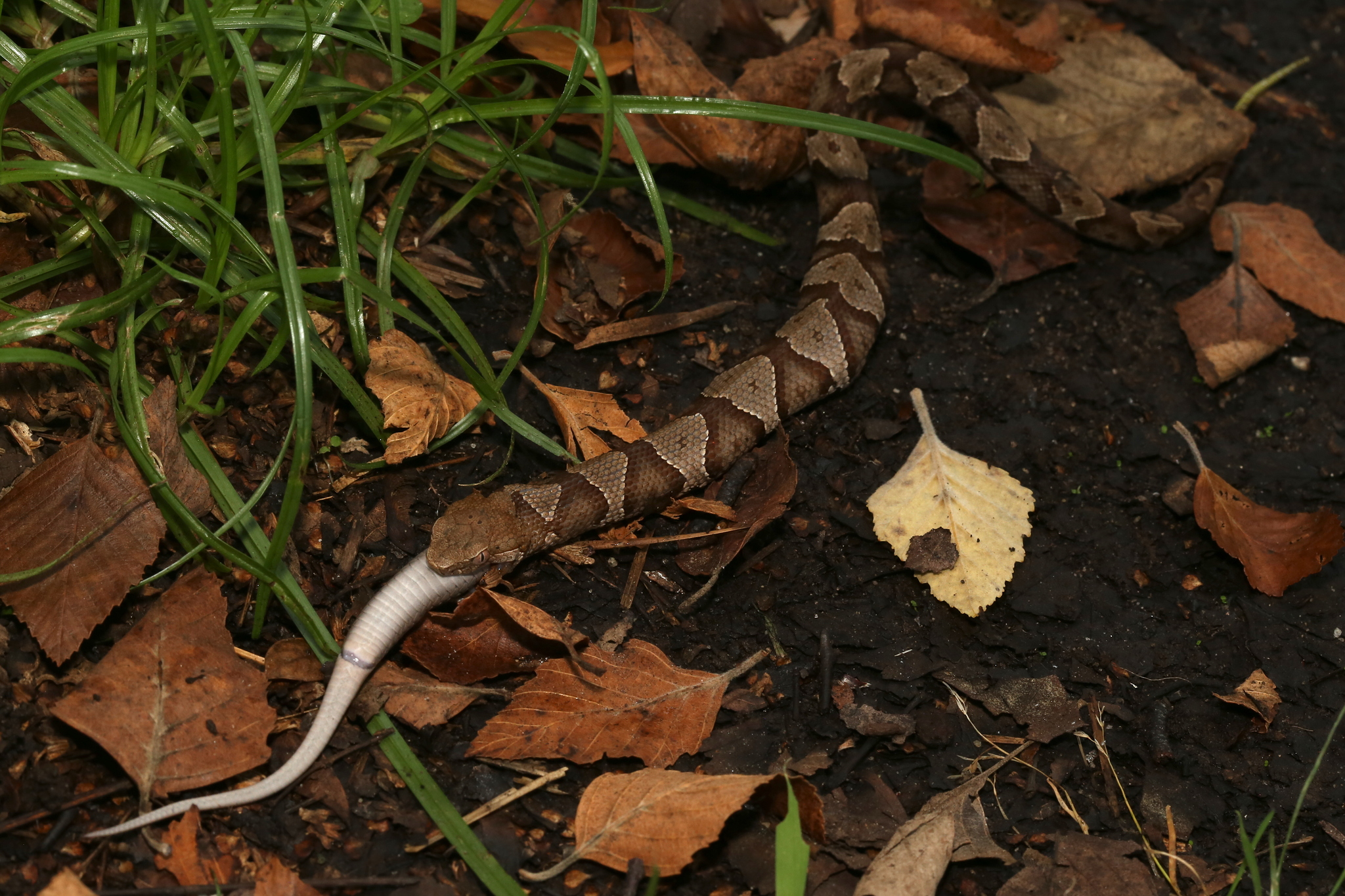
Eating a DeKay's brown snake

The eastern copperhead is a diet generalist and is known to feed on a wide variety of prey, including invertebrates (primarily arthropods) and vertebrates. A generalized ontogenetic shift in the diet occurs, with juveniles feeding on higher percentages of invertebrates and ectotherms, and adults feeding on a higher percentage vertebrate endotherms. Both juveniles and adults, though, feed on invertebrates and vertebrates opportunistically. The diet is also known to vary among geographic populations.

Studies conducted at various locations within the range of the eastern copperhead (A. contortrix), including Tennessee, Kentucky, Kansas, and Texas, identified some consistently significant prey items included cicadas (Tibicen), caterpillars (Lepidoptera), lizards (Sceloporus and Scincella), voles (Microtus), and mice (Peromyscus). Accounts of finding large numbers of copperheads in bushes, vines, and trees seeking newly emerged cicadas, some as high as 40 feet above ground, have been reported from Texas by various herpetologists.

Other items documented in the diet include various invertebrates, e.g. millipedes (Diplopoda), spiders (Arachnida), beetles (Coleoptera), dragonflies (Odonata), grasshoppers (Orthoptera), and mantids (Mantidae), as well as numerous species of vertebrates, including salamanders, frogs, lizards, snakes, small turtles, small birds, young opossums, squirrels, chipmunks, rabbits, bats, shrews, moles, rats, and mice.

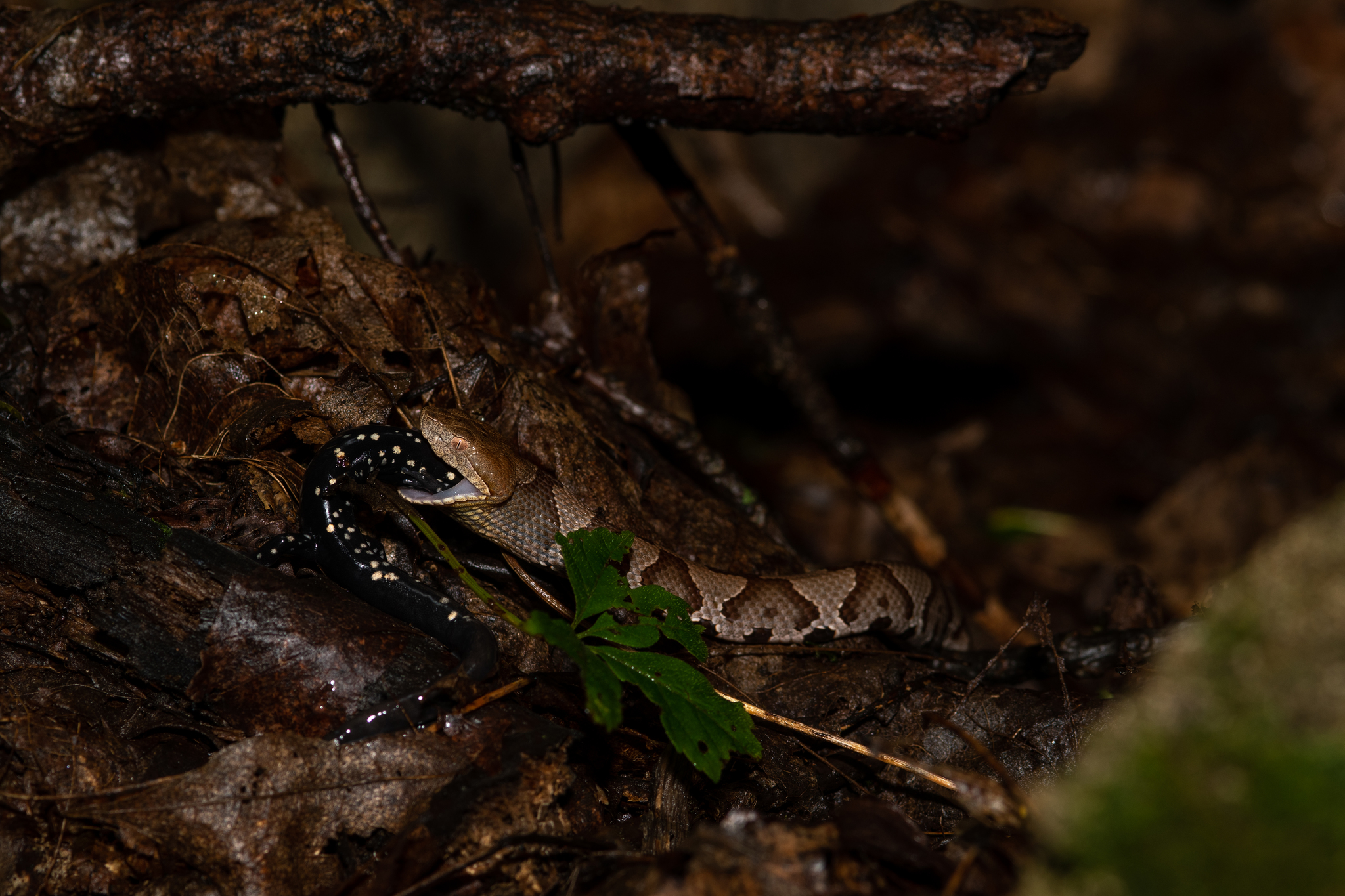
Eating a northern slimy salamander

Like most pit vipers, the eastern copperhead is generally an ambush predator; it takes up a promising position and waits for suitable prey to arrive. One exception to ambush foraging occurs when copperheads feed on insects such as caterpillars and freshly molted cicadas. When hunting insects, copperheads actively pursue their prey. They possess facial pit organs which is a complex infrared-imaging system that allows accurate and precise strikes on potential prey. Juveniles use a brightly colored tail to attract frogs and perhaps lizards, a behavior termed caudal luring Sight, odor, and heat detection are used in locating prey, although after the prey has been envenomated, odor and taste become the primary means of tracking. Smaller prey items and birds are often seized and held in the mouth until dead, while larger prey items are typically bitten, released, and then tracked until dead. Copperheads occasionally feed on carrion. Gravid females typically fast, although some individuals occasionally take small volumes of food. An individual may eat up to twice its body mass in a year. One study found an individual that ate eight times during an annual activity period, totaling 1.25 times its body mass.

Predators of the eastern copperhead are not well known, but may include owls, hawks, opossums, bullfrogs, and other snakes, including the Kingsnake. They will use anti-predatory behaviors to discourage predators. These include: move away or flee, musking, tail vibrating, mouth gaping, or curling up into a camouflage pile.

== Reproduction ==
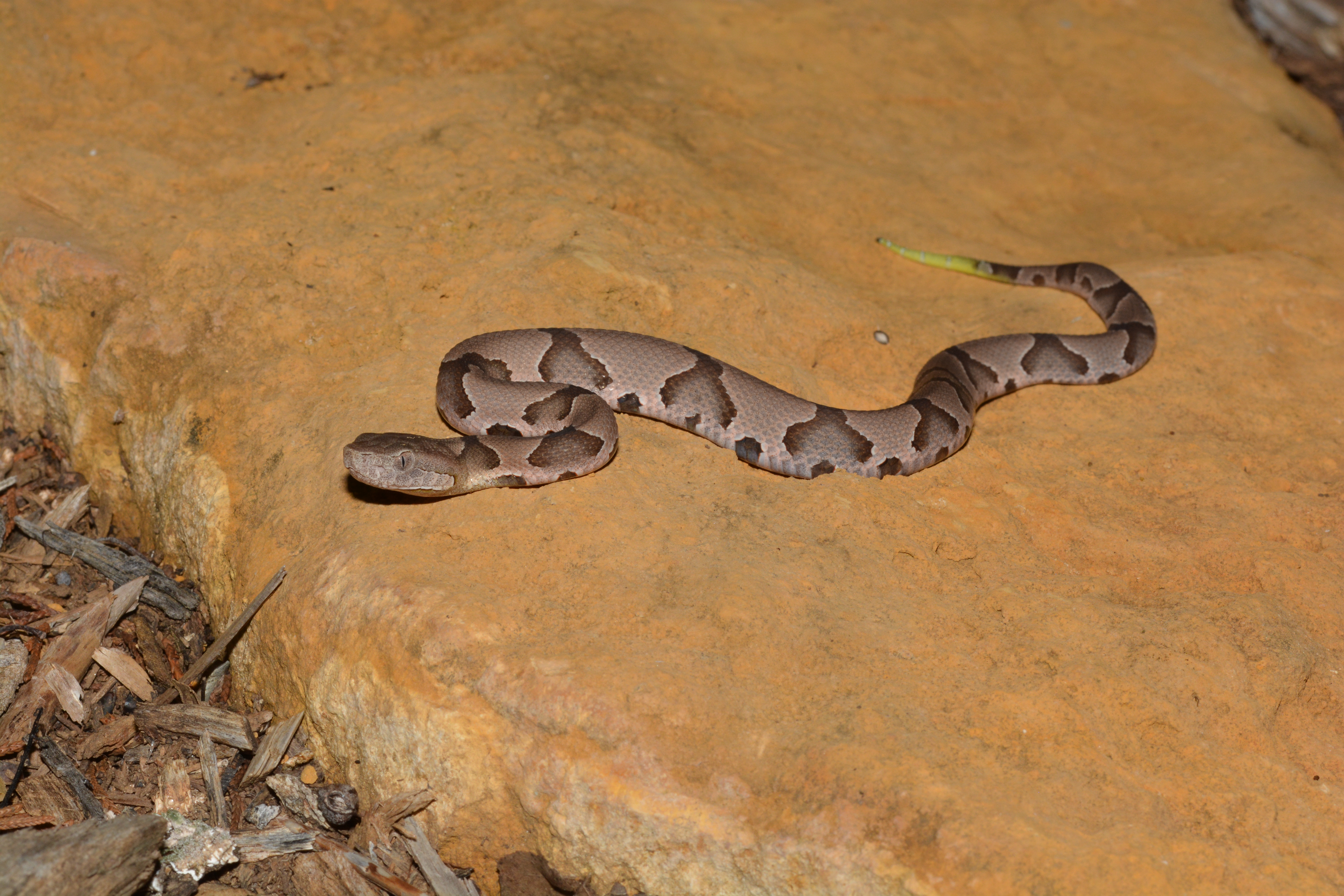
Juvenile in Missouri, showing the characteristic yellow tail of juveniles

Eastern copperheads breed in late summer, but not every year; sometimes, females produce young for several years running, then do not breed at all for a time. Mating is sometimes preceded by male combat. In male combat, losing experience had a greater effect than SVL in winning access to females. Females give birth to live young, each of which is about 20 cm (8 in) in total length. The typical litter size is four to seven, but as few as one, or as many as 20 may be seen. Females are capable of storing sperm for up to a year. Their size apart, the young are similar to the adults, but lighter in color, and with a yellowish-green-marked tip to the tail, which is used to lure lizards and frogs.

A. contortrix males have longer tongue tie lengths than females during the breeding season, which may aid in chemoreception of males searching for females.

=== Facultative parthenogenesis ===
Parthenogenesis is a natural form of reproduction in which growth and development of embryos occur without fertilization. A. contortrix can reproduce by facultative parthenogenesis, that is, they are capable of switching from a sexual mode of reproduction to an asexual mode. The type of parthenogenesis that likely occurs is automixis with terminal fusion, a process in which two terminal products from the same meiosis fuse to form a diploid zygote. This process leads to genome-wide homozygosity, expression of deleterious recessive alleles, and often to developmental failure (inbreeding depression). Both captive-born and wild-born A. contortrix snakes appear to be capable of this form of parthenogenesis.

== Venom ==
Although venomous, eastern copperheads are generally not aggressive and bites are rarely fatal. Copperhead venom has an estimated lethal dose around 100 mg, and tests on mice show its potency is among the lowest of all pit vipers, and slightly weaker than that of its close relative, the cottonmouth. Copperheads often employ a "warning bite" when stepped on or agitated and inject a relatively small amount of venom, if any at all. "Dry bites" involving no venom are particularly common with the copperhead, though all pit vipers are capable of a dry bite. The fangs of dead pit vipers are capable of delivering venom in amounts that necessitate the use of antivenom.

Bite symptoms include extreme pain, tingling, throbbing, swelling, and severe nausea. Damage can occur to muscle and bone tissue, especially when the bite occurs in the outer extremities such as the hands and feet, areas in which a large muscle mass is not available to absorb the venom. A bite from any venomous snake should be taken very seriously and immediate medical attention sought, as an allergic reaction and secondary infection are always possible.

The antivenom CroFab is used to treat copperhead envenomations that demonstrate localized or systemic reactions to the venom. As many copperhead bites can be dry (no envenomation), CroFab is not given in the absence of a reaction (such as swelling) due to the risk of complications of an allergic reaction to the treatment. The antivenom can cause an immune reaction called serum sickness. Pain management, tetanus immunization, laboratory evaluation, and medical supervision in the case of complications are additional courses of action. In 2002, an Illinois poison control center report on the availability of antivenom stated it used 1 Acp to 5 Acp depending on the symptoms and circumstances. Antivenom use however may not be necessary in the majority of cases, A study that analyzed 88 copperhead bite victims reported that all the victims survived and none required antivenom.

=== Research ===
The venom of the southern copperhead has been found to hold the protein contortrostatin that halts the growth of cancer cells in mice and also stops the migration of the tumors to other sites. However, this is an animal model, and further testing is required to verify safety and efficacy in humans.

== Subspecies ==
This species was long considered to contain five subspecies listed below, but gene analysis suggests that A. c. laticinctus represents its own distinct species, while A. c. mokasen and A. c. phaeogaster are regional variants of A. c. contortrix, and A. c. pictigaster is a regional variant of A. c. laticinctus.

Five subspecies have been recognized in the past, but recent genetic analysis shows that A c. contortrix and two of the subspecies are monotypic, while Agkistrodon laticinctus (formerly Agkistrodon contortrix laticinctus) and the fifth subspecies are a single distinct species.

| Previous taxonomy | Current taxonomy | Geographic range |
|---|---|---|
| Southern copperhead Agkistrodon contortrix contortrix (Linnaeus, 1766) | Eastern copperhead Agkistrodon contortrix (Linnaeus, 1766) | The United States: east Texas, east Oklahoma, extreme eastern Kansas, and extreme southeastern Nebraska, eastward to the Atlantic coast; north to extreme southeast Iowa, southern Illinois, southern Indiana, southern Ohio, Pennsylvania, southeast New York, Massachusetts, and parts of Connecticut; absent from southern Georgia and the Florida Peninsula. |
| Broad-banded copperhead Agkistrodon contortrix laticinctus Gloyd & Conant, 1934 | Broad-banded copperhead Agkistrodon laticinctus Gloyd & Conant, 1934 | In the United States from eastern Kansas, southwest through central Oklahoma, central and Trans-Pecos, Texas and neighboring areas of northern Chihuahua and Coahuila, Mexico. |
| Northern copperhead Agkistrodon contortrix mokasen Palisot de Beauvois, 1799 | Eastern copperhead Agkistrodon contortrix | The United States, in southern Illinois, extreme northeastern Mississippi, northern Alabama, northern Georgia northeast to Massachusetts, the Appalachian Mountain region and associated plateaus |
| Osage copperhead Agkistrodon contortrix phaeogaster Gloyd, 1969 | Eastern copperhead Agkistrodon contortrix | US, in eastern Kansas, extreme southeastern Nebraska and a large part of Missouri |
| Trans-Pecos copperhead Agkistrodon contortrix pictigaster Gloyd & Conant, 1943 | Broad-banded copperhead Agkistrodon laticinctus | The Trans-Pecos region of western Texas and adjacent areas of northern Chihuahua and Coahuila, Mexico. |

== Gallery ==
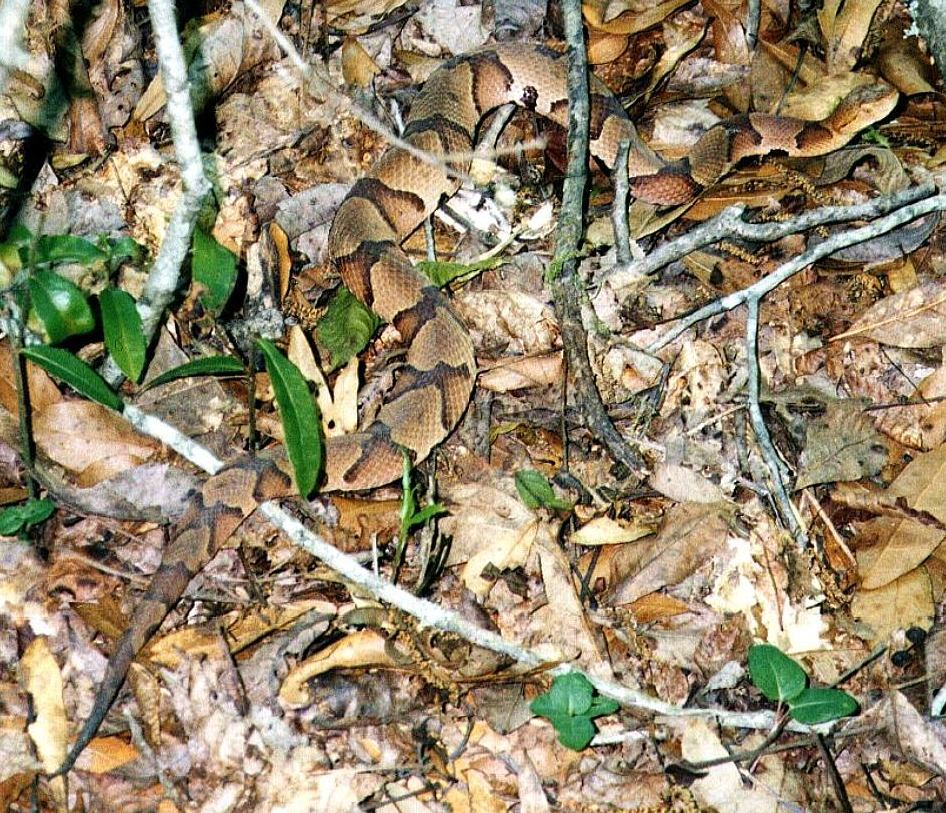
Eastern copperhead, A. contortrix, at the southern limit of its range, in Liberty Co., Florida, camouflaged in dead leaves.

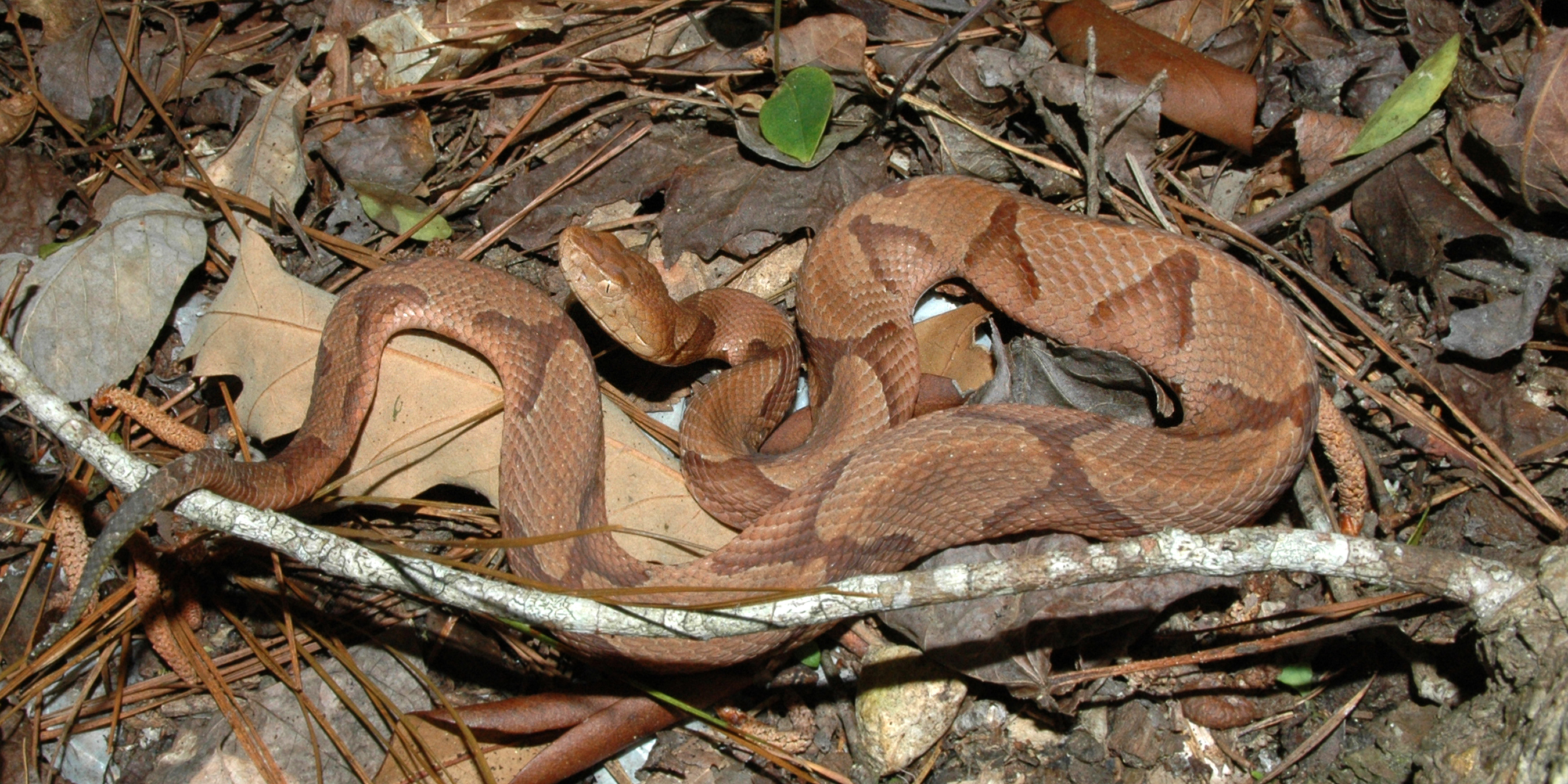
Eastern copperhead (Agkistrodon contortrix) from Liberty Co., Texas (30 March 2007).

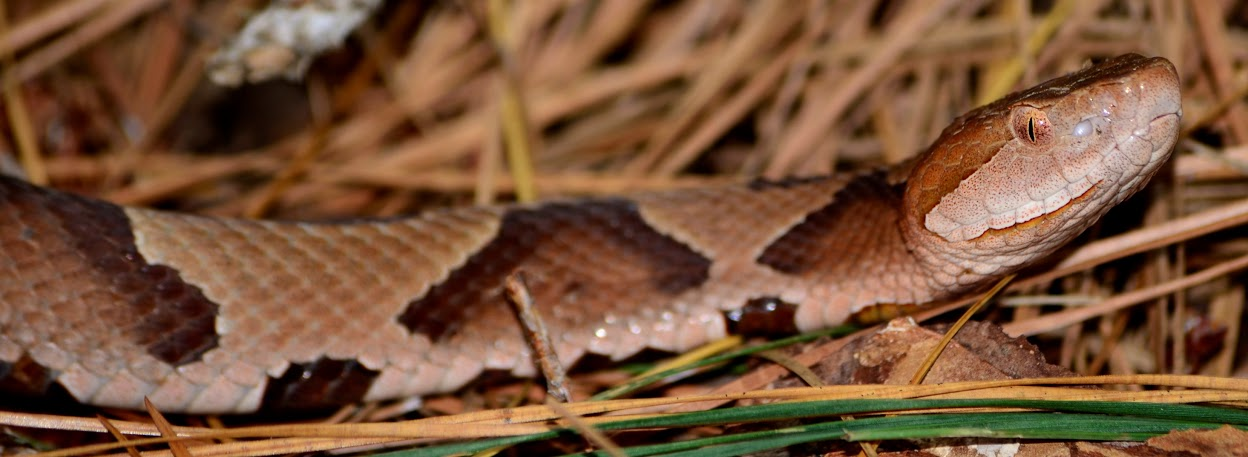
Eastern copperhead (Agkistrodon contortrix) from Georgetown Co., South Carolina (23 August 2013).

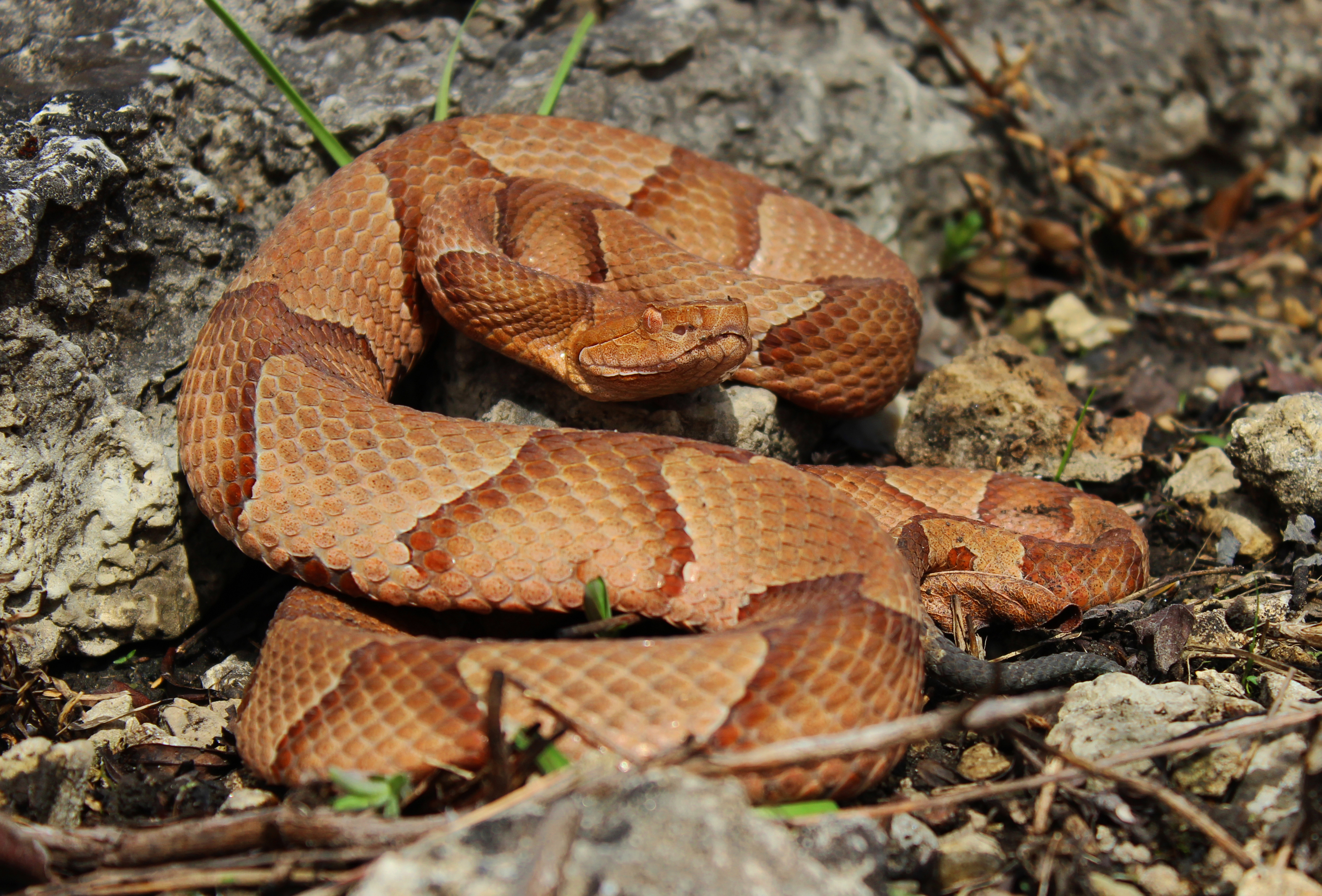
Eastern copperhead (Agkistrodon contortrix) Jefferson Co., Missouri (5 April 2015: 67 °F) were previously classified as "Osage copperhead" (Agkistrodon contortrix phaeogaster).

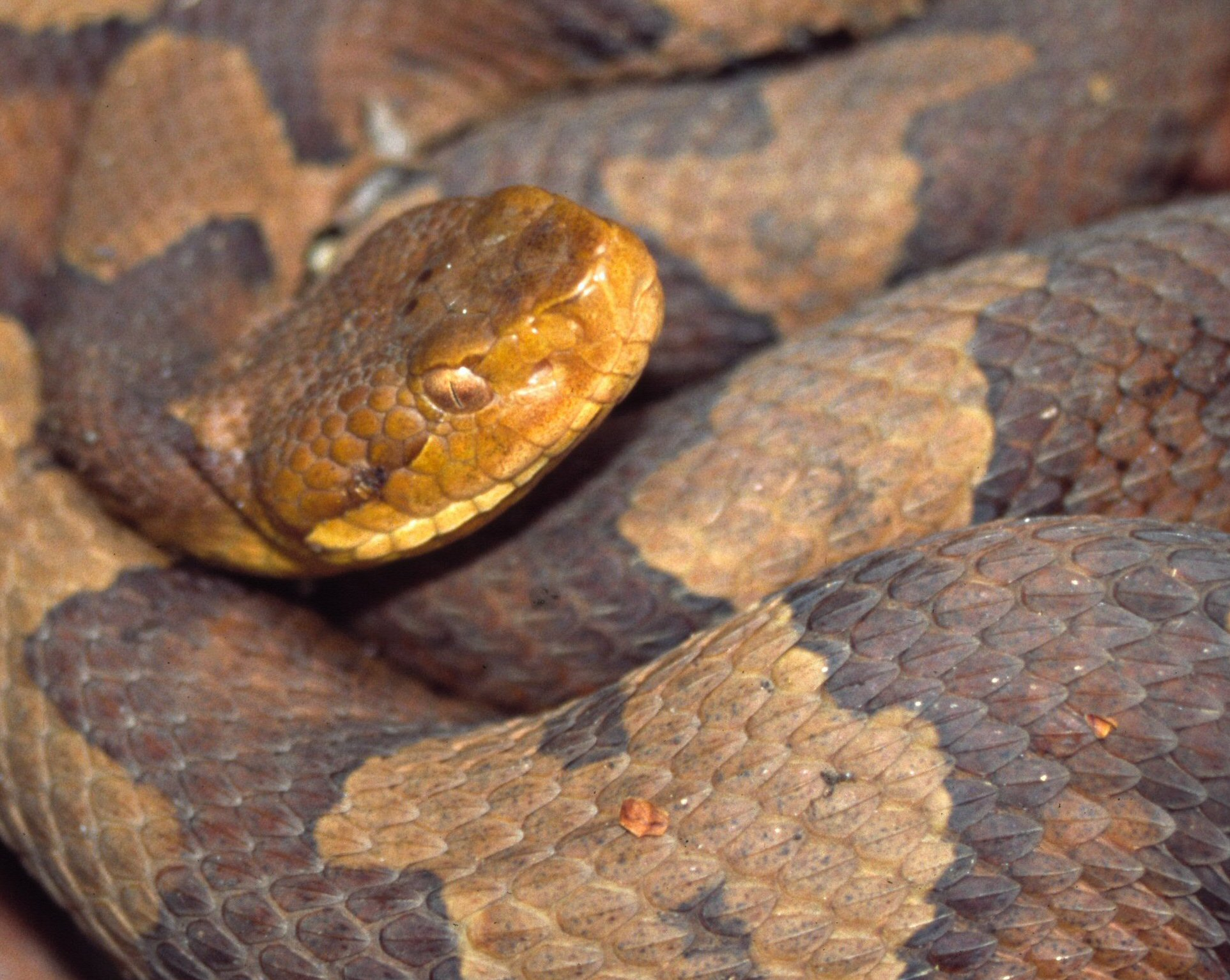
Eastern copperhead (Agkistrodon contortrix) Westchester County, New York (May 2002). Northern populations, typically darker, were previously classified as A. c. mokasen.

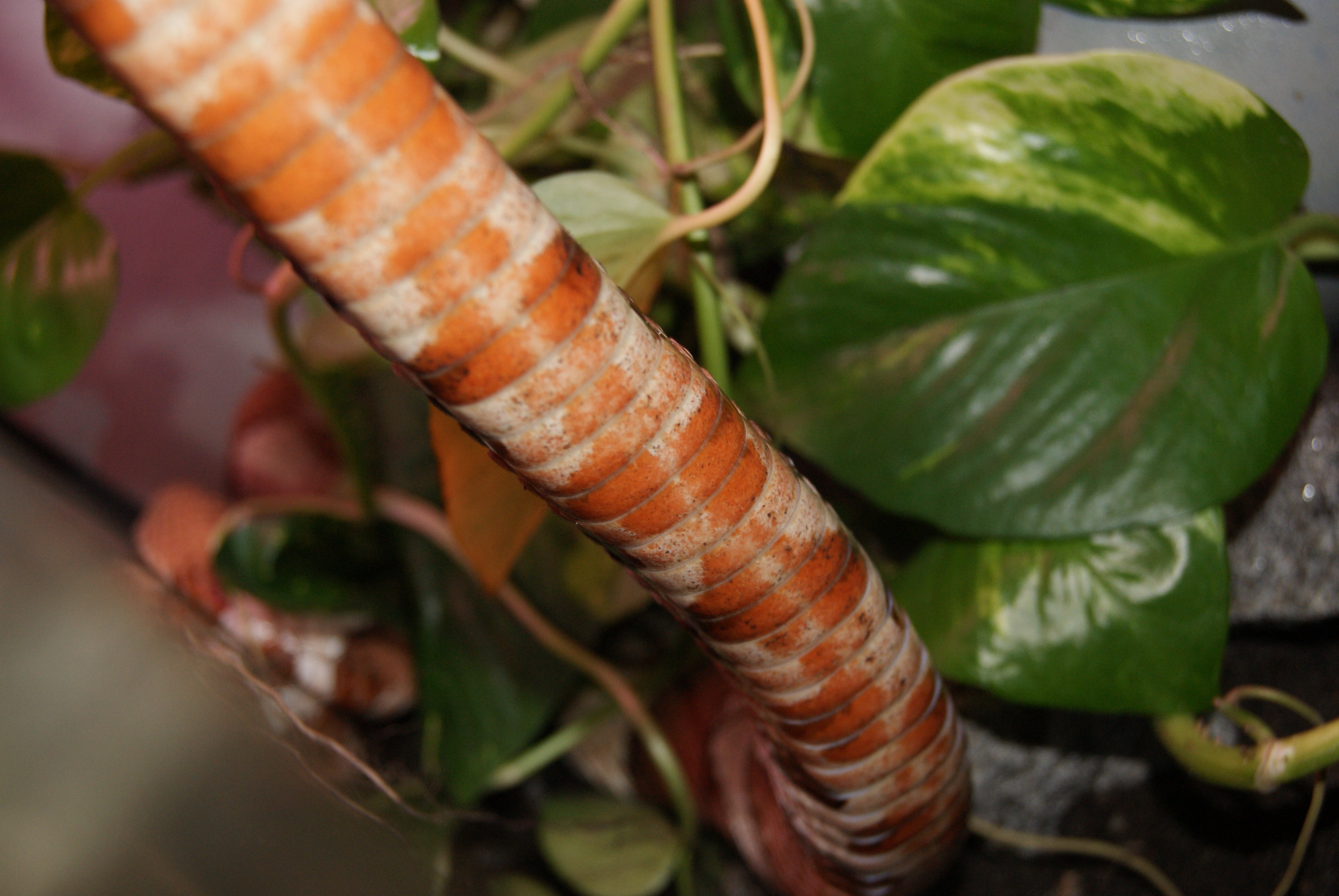
View of the ventral, or belly, pattern of a copperhead.
