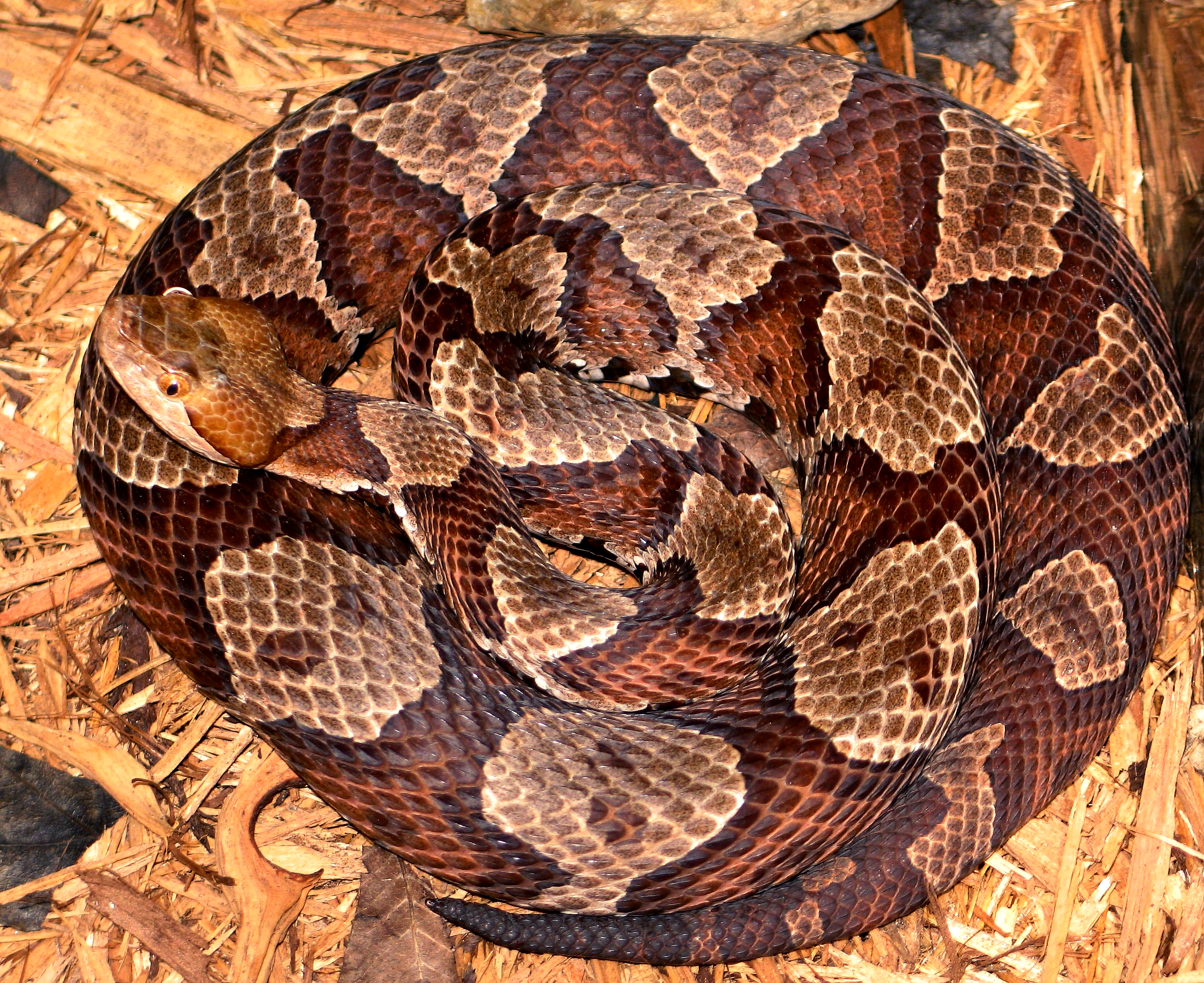

Scientific classification
- Kingdom: Animalia
- Phylum: Chordata
- Class: Reptilia
- Order: Squamata
- Suborder: Serpentes
- Family: Viperidae
- Genus: Agkistrodon
- Species: A. contortrix
- Subspecies: A. c. mokasen

Trinomial name
- Agkistrodon contortrix mokasen Palisot de Beauvois, 1799

Synonyms
- Agkistrodon mokason Palisot de Beauvois, 1799; Agkishodon mokasen Palisot de Beauvois, 1799; Cenchris mokeson Daudin, 1803; Scytale mockeson Say, 1819; Agkistrodon mokasen – Beyer, 1898; Ancistrodon mokasen – Brown, 1908; Agkistrodon mokasen mokasen – Gloyd & Conant, 1934; Agkistrodon mokeson mokeson – Gloyd & Conant, 1943; Agkistrodon mokeson – Davis & Brimley, 1944; Agkistrodon contortrix mokeson – Klauber, 1948; Agkistrodon contortrix mokasen – Klimstra, 1950; Ancistrodon contortrix mokeson – Schmidt, 1953; Agkistrodon contortrix makasen Bonn & McCarley, 1953; Ancistrodon contortrix mokasen – Petersen, 1970; Agkistrodon contortrix mokasen – Harding & Welch, 1980

= Agkistrodon contortrix mokasen =

Subspecies of snake

Agkistrodon contortrix mokasen (or northern copperhead) was formerly a venomous pit viper subspecies found in the eastern United States. However, recent taxonomic changes do not recognize the northern copperhead (A. c. mokasen) as a valid taxon.

== New taxonomy ==
The northern copperhead (Agkistrodon contortrix mokasen) was once classified as a subspecies of the copperhead (Agkistrodon contortrix). However, DNA based studies published in 2008 and 2015, revealed no significant genetic difference between the northern copperhead (Agkistrodon contortrix mokasen), the southern copperhead (Agkistrodon contortrix contortrix) and the Osage copperhead (Agkistrodon contortrix phaeogaster). The three subspecies were synonymized and elevated to one species, with the oldest published name, Agkistrodon contortrix, having priority. The resulting taxonomy does not recognize the northern copperhead (Agkistrodon contortrix mokasen) as a valid taxon. Several subsequent reviews and species accounts have followed and supported the revised taxonomy.

== Description ==
The northern copperhead grows to a typical length of 61–91 cm (24–36 in), with a maximum of 135 cm (53 in).

The dorsal scales are weakly keeled. The anal plate is single. The subcaudals are single, at least anteriorly.

The color pattern consists of an hourglass pattern that runs the length of the body. From above, a series of dark chestnut crossbands looks narrow in the center and wider on the sides. Between the crossbands, small, dark spots are often present. Dark, rounded spots occur at the sides of the belly. The head is a copper-red color. Juvenile specimens are lighter in color, and have a yellow tail tip and a narrow dark line that runs through the eye that divides the darker head from the lighter-colored labial scales.

== Common names ==
Northern copperhead, copperhead, resident copperhead, highland moccasin, beech-leaf snake, chunk head, copper (adder), copper-bell, copper belly, copperhead moccasin, copperhead viper, copper snake, copper viper, deaf adder, deaf snake, harlequin snake, hazel head, North American copperhead snake, northern copperhead, pilot, poplar leaf, rattlesnake pilot, rattlesnake's mate, red adder, red eye, red snake, red viper, thunder snake, upland moccasin, white oak snake, adder.

== Geographic range ==
This subspecies is found in the United States in Washington D.C., Maryland, Virginia, East Texas, southern Illinois, southern Indiana, throughout Mississippi, northern Alabama, northern Georgia, northeast to Massachusetts (which considers them endangered), New York Hudson Valley region, the Appalachian Mountain region and associated plateaus, and southwestern Pennsylvania. No type locality was given.

== Behavior ==
These snakes are generally quiet, almost lethargic, preferring to lie motionless or to make a slow retreat when encountered. When sufficiently agitated, however, they can strike vigorously and may vibrate their tails rapidly.
