= Spotted rattler =

Spotted rattler may refer to:

- Sistrurus catenatus, also known as the massasauga, a venomous pitviper species found primarily in the United States
- Sistrurus miliarius, also known as the pigmy rattlesnake, a venomous pitviper species found in the southeastern United States
