= Crotalophorus =

Crotalophorus is a taxonomic synonym that may refer to:

- Crotalus, a.k.a. rattlesnakes, a genus of venomous pitvipers found only in the Americas from southern Canada to northern Argentina
- Sistrurus, a.k.a. ground rattlesnakes, a genus of venomous pitvipers found in Canada, the United States and Mexico
