= Caudisona =

Caudisona may refer to:

- Crotalus, a.k.a. rattlesnakes, a genus of venomous pitvipers found in the Americas from southern Canada to northern Argentina
- Sistrurus, a.k.a. ground rattlesnakes, a genus of venomous pitvipers found in Canada, the United States and Mexico
