= Hog-nosed rattler =

Hog-nosed rattler may refer to:

- Sistrurus miliarius barbouri, a.k.a. the dusky pigmy rattlesnake, a venomous pitviper subspecies found in the southeastern United States
- Heterodon platirhinos, a.k.a. the eastern hog-nosed snake, harmless colubrid species found in North America
