= Swamp rattler =

Swamp rattler may refer to:

- Crotalus horridus, a.k.a. the timber rattlesnake, a venomous pitviper species found in the eastern United States
- Sistrurus catenatus, a.k.a. the massasauga, a venomous pitviper species found primarily in the United States
