= Bastard rattlesnake =

Bastard rattlesnake may refer to:

- Crotalus horridus, a.k.a. the timber rattlesnake, a venomous pitviper species found in the eastern United States
- Sistrurus miliarius, a.k.a. the pygmy rattlesnake, a venomous pitviper species found in the southeastern United States
- Heterodon platirhinos, a.k.a. the eastern hog-nosed snake, a harmless colubrid species found in North America
