= Southern rattlesnake =

Southern rattlesnake may refer to:

- Crotalus oreganus, a.k.a. the Pacific rattlesnake, a venomous pitviper species found in North America in the western United States, parts of British Columbia and northwestern Mexico
- Sistrurus miliarius, a.k.a. the pigmy rattlesnake, a venomous pitviper species found in the southeastern United States
