= Small rattlesnake =

Small rattlesnake may refer to:

- Crotalus horridus, a.k.a. the timber rattlesnake, a venomous pitviper species found in the eastern United States.
- Sistrurus miliarius, a.k.a. the pigmy rattlesnake, a venomous pitviper species found in the southeastern United States.
