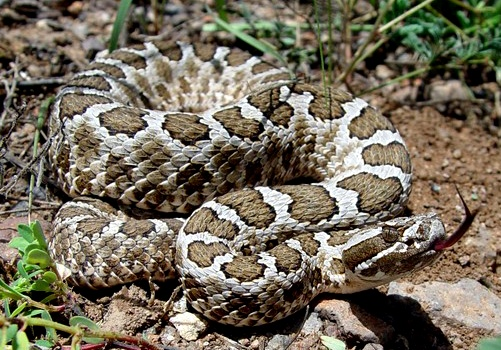

Conservation status
- Vulnerable (NatureServe)

Scientific classification
- Kingdom: Animalia
- Phylum: Chordata
- Order: Squamata
- Suborder: Serpentes
- Family: Viperidae
- Genus: Sistrurus
- Species: S. tergeminus
- Subspecies: S. t. edwardsii

Trinomial name
- Sistrurus tergeminus edwardsii (Baird & Girard, 1853)

Synonyms
- Sistrurus catenatus edwardsii —(Baird & Girard, 1853); Crotalophorus Edwardsii Baird & Girard, 1853; C[rotalus]. (Crotalophorus) miliarius var. Edwardsii — Jan, 1863; Caudisona edwardsii — Yarrow, 1875; [Sistrurus miliarius] Var. edwardsii — Garman, 1884; Crotalophorus catenatus edwardsii — Cope, 1892; Sistrurus catenatus edwardsii — Stejneger, 1895; Sistrurus edwardsii — Cockerell, 1896; Sistrurus catenatus var. edwardsii — Ditmars, 1907; Sistrurus catenatus edwardsi — Gloyd, 1955; Crotalus (Sistrurus) catenatus edwardsi — Hoge, 1966

= Sistrurus tergeminus edwardsii =

Desert massasauga

Subspecies of snake

Sistrurus tergeminus edwardsii, also known as the desert massasauga, is a subspecies of venomous pit viper in the family Viperidae. The subspecies is endemic to the Southwestern United States and northern Mexico. In places, its range overlaps that of S. t. tergeminus, and intergrading of the two subspecies is known.

== Etymology ==
The subspecific name, edwardsii, is in honor of Colonel Dr. Lewis A. Edwards (1824–1877), a U.S. Army surgeon, who collected the type specimen. Common names include desert massasauga, Edward's massasauga, Edward's rattlesnake.

== Description ==
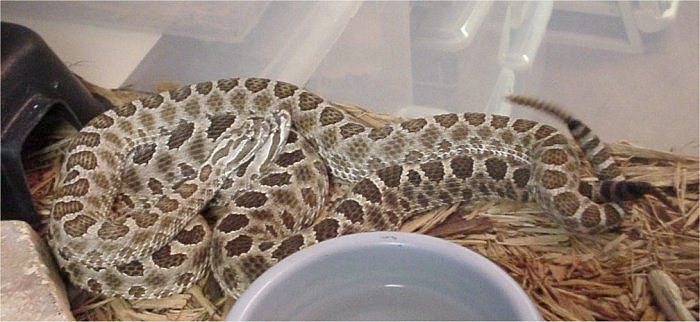
S. t. edwardsi pair in copula (mating)

S. t. edwardsii is more slender and smaller than S. t. tergeminus, reaching a maximum total length (including tail) of 53 cm (21 in).

Its color pattern consists of a light gray or white base color, with dark gray or gray-brown blotches. It has a distinctive, dark stripe that runs along the side of the head, which passes over the eye. The rattle is significantly higher pitched than those of larger species of rattlesnakes, sometimes giving it the nickname "buzztail".

Compared to S. t. tergeminus, it is paler in color, and its belly is nearly white. Midbody, it has 23 rows of dorsal scales instead of 25, and fewer ventral scales and dorsal blotches.

== Distribution ==
S. t. edwardsii is found in extreme southeastern Arizona, central and southern New Mexico, West Texas about as far north and east as the Colorado River, in the Rio Grande Valley, in many of the Gulf Coast counties about as far north as Brazoria, and on several barrier islands including North Padre Island, Matagorda Island, and San José Island. In addition, isolated populations have been reported in northeastern Mexico. The type locality is listed as "Tamaulipas ... S. Bank of Rio Grande ... Sonora".

== Habitat ==
S. t. edwardsii is primarily found in rocky, semiarid, and arid areas. According to Conant (1975), it is mostly found in desert grasslands.

== Behavior ==
This subspecies is primarily nocturnal, especially during the summer, when the weather is too hot for it to be active, but it can sometimes be found basking.

== Feeding ==
The diet of S. t. edwardsii consists primarily of rodents, lizards, and frogs.

== Venom ==
Drop for drop, massasauga venom is more potent than that of many larger species of rattlesnakes, but due to the lower yield (the amount it is capable of delivering in a single bite), its potential for harm is greatly reduced. It is not considered to be deadly, but the venom is a powerful cytotoxic venom that can cause swelling, necrosis, damage to the skin, and severe pain. Medical treatment should be sought immediately for any venomous snake bite. The antivenin CroFab, while not type-specific, can be used to treat severe envenomations from massasaugas.

== Conservation status ==
The desert massasauga is listed as a species of concern in Colorado, due to its limited range in the state, and it is protected by Arizona state law. It is listed as a sensitive species by the United States Forest Service. NatureServe considers the subspecies Vulnerable.
