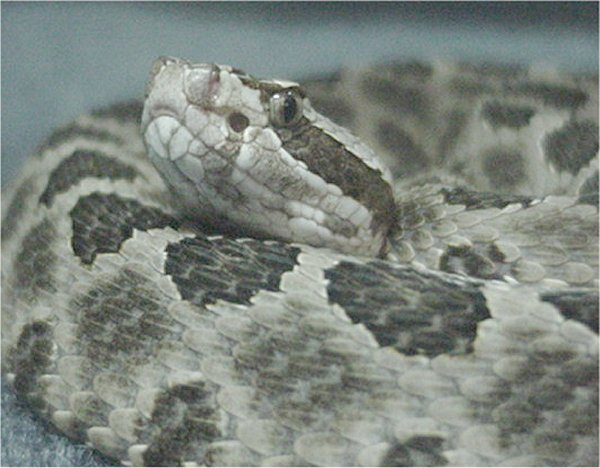

Conservation status
- Vulnerable (NatureServe)

Scientific classification
- Kingdom: Animalia
- Phylum: Chordata
- Class: Reptilia
- Order: Squamata
- Suborder: Serpentes
- Family: Viperidae
- Genus: Sistrurus
- Species: S. tergeminus

Binomial name
- Sistrurus tergeminus (Say, 1823)

Synonyms
- Crotalus tergeminus Say In James, 1823; Crotalophorus tergeminus – Gray, 1831; Crotalophorus tergeminus – Baird & Girard, 1853; C[rotalus]. (Crotalophorus) miliarius var. tergeminus – Jan, 1863; Caudisona tergemina – Cope, 1875; Sistrurus catenatus tergeminus – Klauber, 1936

= Sistrurus tergeminus =

Species of snake

Sistrurus tergeminus, also known commonly as the western massasauga, is a species of rattlesnake native to the southwestern plains of the United States and northern Mexico. Like all rattlesnakes, it is a pit viper and is venomous.

== Taxonomy ==
Sistrurus tergeminus was once considered a subspecies of the eastern massasauga (Sistrurus catenatus). S. tergeminus contains two subspecies: the nominate S. t. tergeminus, or plains massasauga, found in the Great Plains, and S. t. edwardsii, or desert massasauga, found in the deserts of the Southwestern United States and northern Mexico. The latter is considered "Vulnerable" by NatureServe. According to Campbell and Lamar (2004), a population also exists in southeastern Colorado that is morphologically somewhat intermediate between S. t. tergeminus and S. t. edwardsii.

== Description ==
Adults of Sistrurus tergeminus range in total length (tail included) from 35 to 91 cm (14 to 36 in). The "standard" total length for 43 male and 63 female adult specimens was 68 cm (27 in). Conant (1975) gives a range of total length of 46–66 cm (18–26 in), with a maximum of 88.3 cm (34 3/4 in).

The color pattern is similar to that of S. catenatus, but paler: the dark brown blotches contrast strongly with the tan-gray or light gray ground color. The venter (belly) is light with a few dark markings.

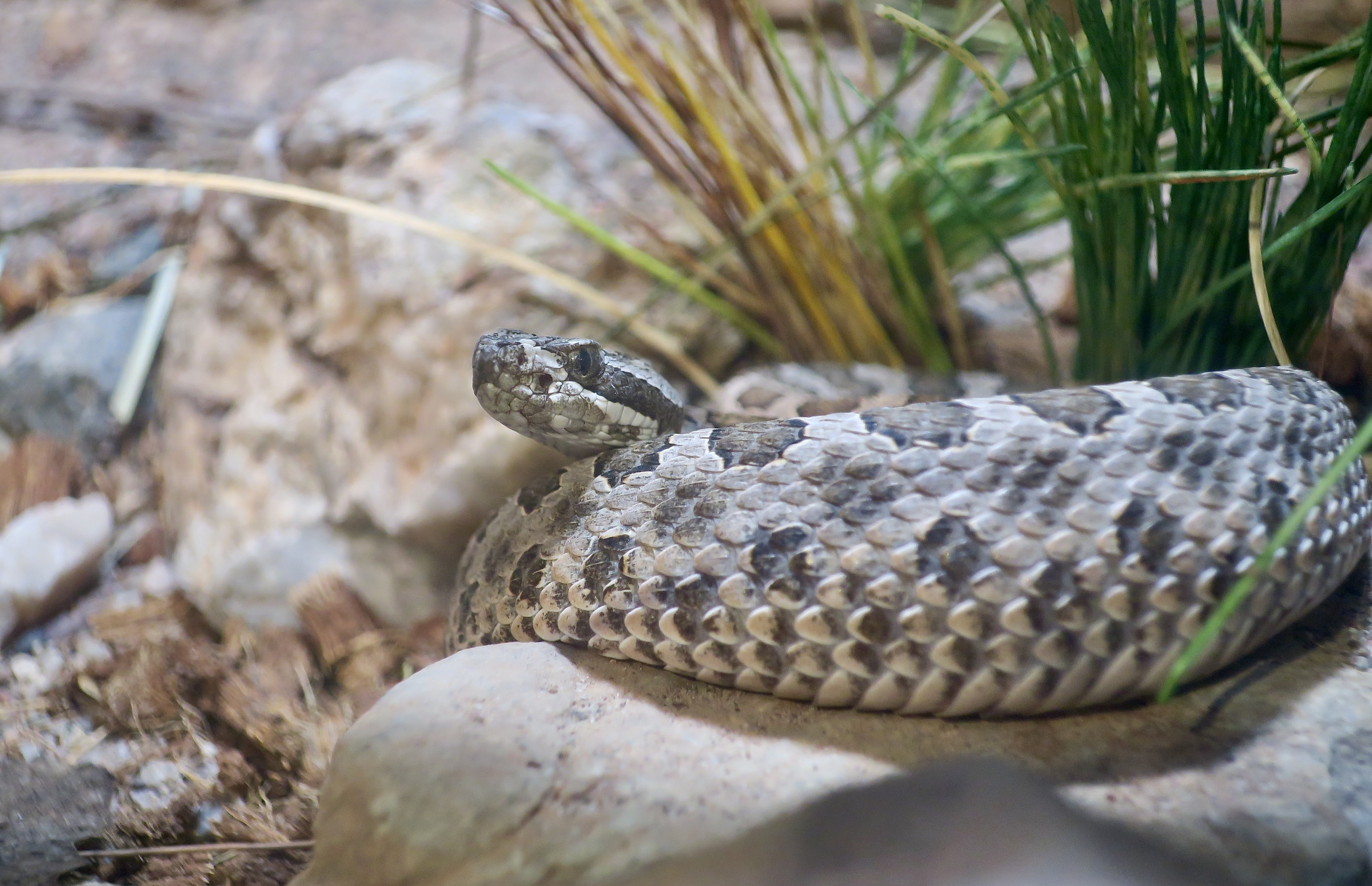
A desert massasauga (Sistrurus tergeminus edwardsii) at Phoenix Zoo.

== Common names ==
Common names for Sistrurus tergeminus include western massasauga, ground rattlesnake, Gulf Coast massasauga, víbora de cascabel (Mexico), Edward's massasauga, large ground rattlesnake, Say's false rattlesnake, Sonora ground rattlesnake, Texas massasauga, three-spotted shield rattler, triple-spotted rattlesnake, and prairie massasauga.

== Geographic distribution ==
In the United States, Sistrurus tergeminus is found in the southwestern plains from southeastern Colorado to extreme southeastern Nebraska and northwestern Missouri, southwest through east-central Kansas and west-central Oklahoma into northern and central Texas about as far southwest as the Colorado River. It is also found in Mexico, in the states of Tamaulipas, southern Nuevo León, north-central Coahuila, and Samalayuca, Chihuahua. The type locality given is "between the Mississippi River and the Rocky Mountains".

== Behavior ==
Sistrurus tergeminus is primarily found in grassland areas, on the edge of open woodland, or on rocky hillsides, and often makes use of the burrows of other animals for shelter. It primarily eats rodents, but may also eat lizards and frogs, having for the purpose a set of enlarged adrenal glands. Its rattle is significantly higher pitched than those of larger species of rattlesnakes, sometimes giving it the nickname "buzztail", and as such should not be relied upon for warning. Primarily nocturnal, the species is considered mild-mannered and sluggish especially during the summer, when the weather is too hot for it to be active and it is sometimes found basking. Though it is most often found by water or immediately after rain, it prefers arid or heavily-covered ground.

== Venom ==
The venom of Sistrurus tergeminus is potent like that of larger species of rattlesnakes, but due to the lower yield (the amount it is capable of delivering in a single bite), its potential for harm is greatly reduced. The venom is a powerful hemotoxin which can cause severe pain, swelling, and necrosis. Despite the snake’s smaller size and less severe bite, envenomation can still be fatal if untreated, and treatment should be sought immediately for any venomous snake bite. The antivenin CroFab, while not type-specific, can be used to treat severe envenomations from massasaugas.
