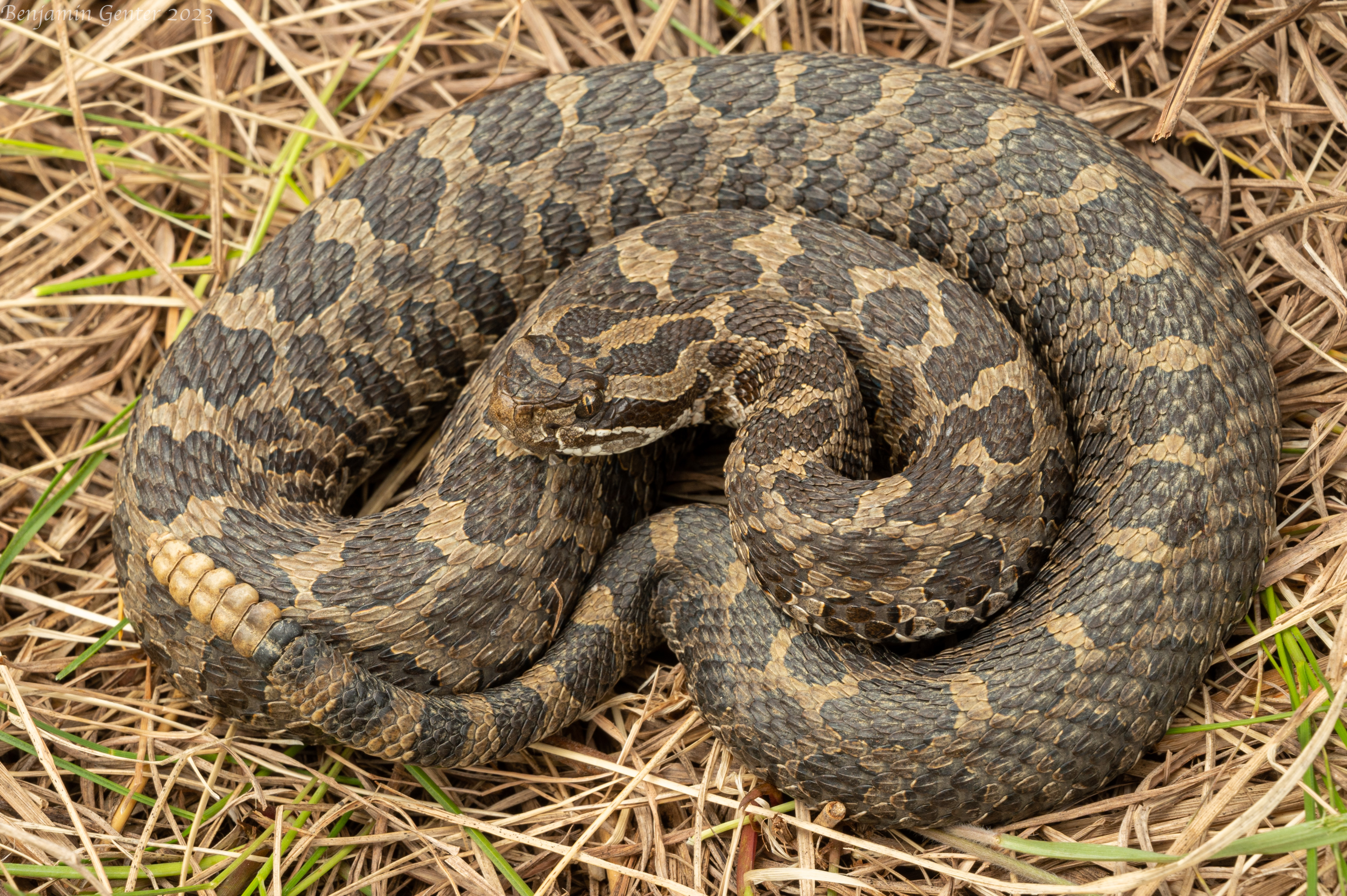

Conservation status
- Least Concern (IUCN 3.1)

- Vulnerable (NatureServe)

Scientific classification
- Kingdom: Animalia
- Phylum: Chordata
- Class: Reptilia
- Order: Squamata
- Suborder: Serpentes
- Family: Viperidae
- Genus: Sistrurus
- Species: S. catenatus

Binomial name
- Sistrurus catenatus (Rafinesque, 1818)
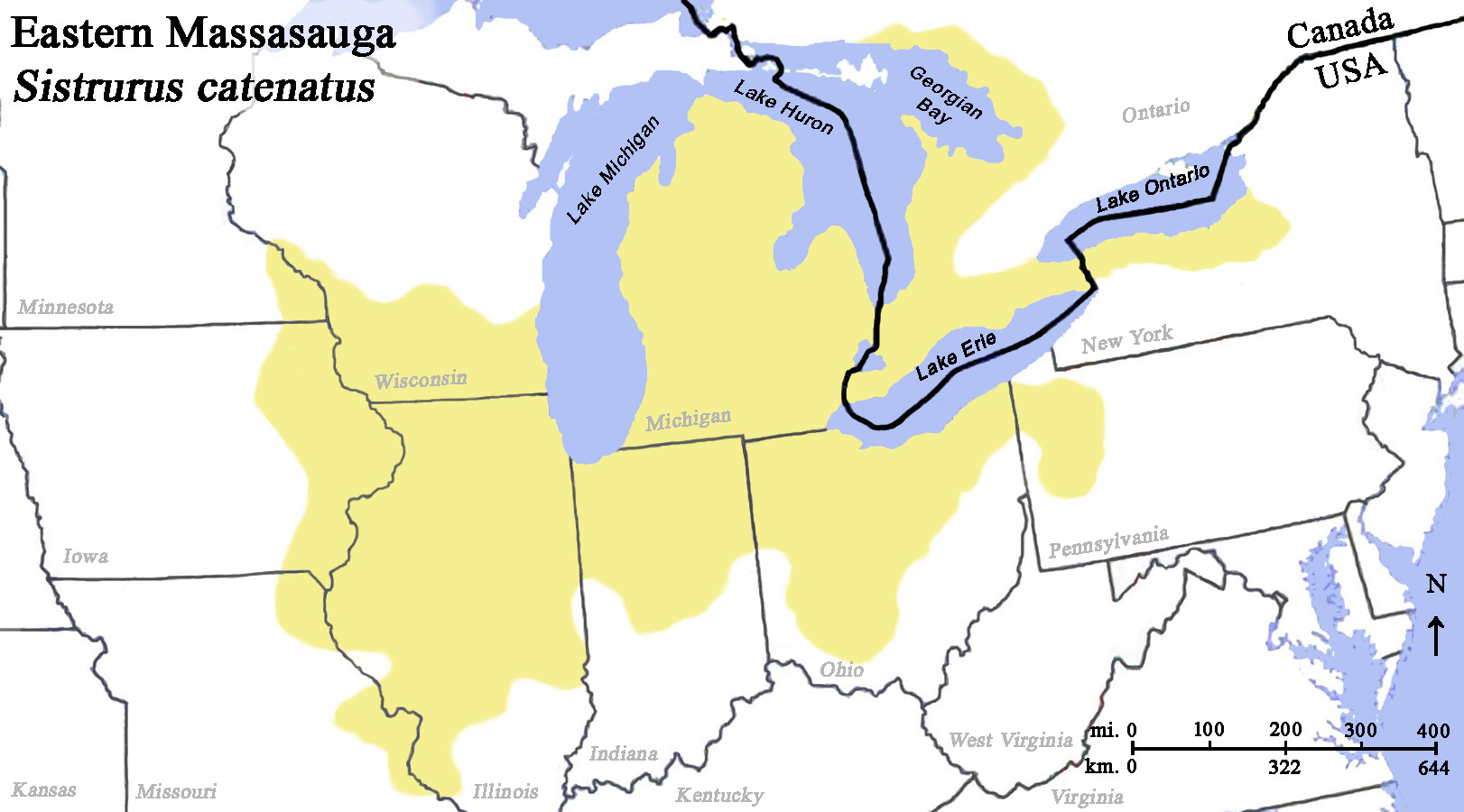
- Historical distribution (c. 1900), now extirpated from much of its range.

Synonyms
- Crotalinus catenatus Rafinesque, 1818; Crotalusrus (Crotalus) catenatus — Rafinesque, 1820; Crotalus messasaugus Kirtland In Mather, 1838; Crotalophorus Kirtlandi Holbrook, 1842; Crotalophorus consors Baird & Girard, 1853; Crotalophorus Kirtlandi — Baird & Girard, 1853; Crotalophorus massasauga — Baird, 1854; C[rotalus]. consors — Coues In Wheeler, 1875; [Sistrurus] catenatus — Garman, 1883; [Sistrurus catenatus] Var. consors — Garman, 1884; Crotalophorus catenatus catenatus — Cope, 1892; Sistrurus catenatus catenatus — Stejneger, 1895; Sistrurus catenatus — Boulenger, 1896; Sistrurus catenatus catenatus — Cope, 1900; Crotalus messaugus — Golay et al., 1993

= Eastern massasauga =

Species of rattlesnake

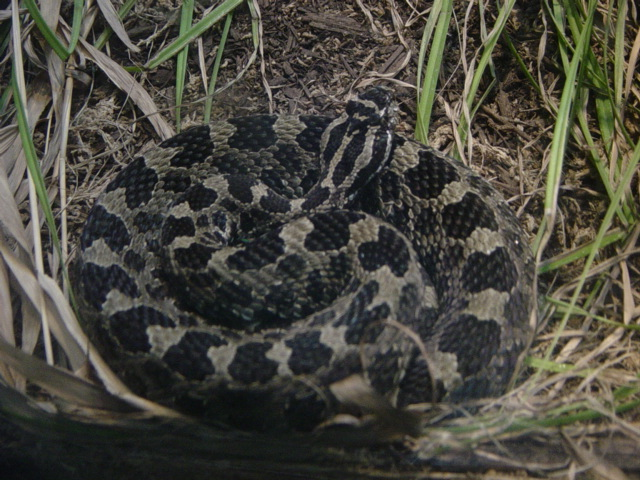
Eastern masasauga coiled in the grass

The eastern massasauga (Sistrurus catenatus) is a species of rattlesnake found in eastern North America, from southern Ontario, Canada, eastern regions of the Midwestern states, and parts of the Great Lakes region in the United States. Like all rattlesnakes, it is a pit viper and is venomous; it is the only species of venomous snake in Ontario.

== Taxonomy ==
Three subspecies of Sistrurus catenatus were recognized for more than a century, although research published in 2011 elevated two subspecies Sistrurus catenatus catenatus and Sistrurus catenatus tergeminus, to full species: the eastern massasauga (Sistrurus catenatus) and the western massasauga (Sistrurus tergeminus). The status of the third subspecies was somewhat unresolved and it is tentatively recognized as the desert massasauga (Sistrurus tergeminus edwardsii) by some, or synonymized with the western massasauga (Sistrurus tergeminus) by others. It is currently thought that eastern massassauga is monotypic, i.e., has no recognized subspecies.

== Etymology and nomenclature ==
The generic name Sistrurus is from the Latin sistrum (or Greek seistron), a "rattle", a form of musical instrument, and oura Greek meaning "tail". The name catenatus is derived from the Latin word catena meaning "chain", in combination with the suffix atus meaning "provided with", which likely alludes to the dorsal color pattern (or possibly the rattle).

The standardized English name of Sistrurus catenatus is eastern massasauga. The Native American word, "massasauga", means "great river-mouth" in the Ojibwe language and was probably given to describe grasslands surrounding the river deltas in Ojibwe country.

Other colloquial names for the eastern massasauga include: massasauga rattlesnake, pine rattler, massasauga rattler (Ontario), black massasauga, black rattler, black snapper, gray rattlesnake (Iowa), little grey rattlesnake (Canada), muck rattler, prairie rattlesnake, spotted rattler, swamp rattler, dwarf prairie rattlesnake, eastern massasauga great adder, ground rattlesnake, Kirtland's rattlesnake, little black rattlesnake, Michigan point rattler (Michigan), prairie massasauga, rattlesnake, small prairie rattlesnake, snapper, swamp massasauga, swamp rattlesnake, and triple-spotted rattlesnake.

== Description ==
Adults of Sistrurus catenatus are not large, ranging from 60 to 75 cm (24 to 30 in) in total length (tail included). The dorsal color pattern consists of a gray or tan ground color, with a row of large, rounded, brown/black blotches or spots down the center of the back, and three smaller rows of alternating spots down each side. Solid black melanistic examples are also known, as well as cases of the back blotches joining with those on the sides. Young massasaugas are well-patterned, but paler than adults. Both adults and young have heat-sensing pits on each side of the smallish head. The dorsal scales are keeled, and the anal scale is single.

== Geographic distribution ==
The eastern massasauga is endemic to North America, where it occurs in the Great Lakes region and eastern portions of the Midwestern United States. Historically it ranged in southern Ontario, Canada, from the eastern vicinity of the North Channel, eastward across the northern and eastern areas of Georgian Bay and Lake Huron, across the Ontario Peninsula to the Niagara Peninsula and areas north of Lake Erie. In the United States it occurred throughout most of lower Michigan (including several islands), the Finger Lakes and Central New York, northwest Pennsylvania, northern Ohio and Indiana, much of Illinois, southern Wisconsin, eastern Iowa, and marginal areas of extreme eastern Missouri and Minnesota.

The species was extirpated throughout large areas of its geographic range in the 20th century and now occurs mostly in smaller, isolated, and disjunct populations within its former range. Exemplary is its occurrence in Illinois, where it was described as formerly common over the northern two-thirds of the state, but is now known from only six or eight relict populations in five or six scattered counties, and Pennsylvania, where 19 populations were known from six northwestern counties, but by 1977 only six populations were known in three counties. Draining of wetlands, agriculture, highway construction, urban development are among the major factors responsible for declines.

== Natural history ==
=== Habitat ===
The eastern massasauga is most often found in the vicinity of wetlands, such as swamps, marshes, bogs, fens containing sedges, minerotrophic shrubby peatlands, wet meadows, and floodplains. Wetlands in meadows, prairies, as well as coniferous forests may be occupied. It often remains near the hibernaculum in the spring and fall months, and crayfish burrows are often occupied. In summer months it may move to dryer habitats, particularly gravid females.

=== Diet ===
The diet of S. catenatus consists of a variety of small vertebrates, including mammals, birds, bird eggs, lizards, and other snakes, as well as invertebrates such as centipedes and insects. Mammals and reptiles make up the bulk of its diet. Adults feed mainly on rodents (such as voles, white-footed mice, jumping mice, and shrews), while juveniles usually prey on reptiles, more often lizards in western populations and snakes in eastern ones. Frogs also constitute an important part of its diet. Ruthven (1928) mentioned that in Michigan frogs made up the main portion of its diet. According to Klauber (1956), S. catenatus feeds on frogs more frequently than any other rattlesnake. In general, however, frogs are not an important part of its diet, although this does seem to be more typical in certain northern and eastern populations.

=== Reproduction ===
Females reach reproductive size at a minimum of 32.5 cm. (12.8 inches) in total length, which is usually attained in the third or fourth year. Like many rattlesnakes, females often do not reproduce annually but typically have a biennial reproductive cycle. Massasaugas are ovoviviparous. Parturition is typically in August or September. Litter sizes of 5–14 have been reported from studies conducted on Illinois populations, and ranges of 6–19 young reported in Wisconsin studies, where a few females were noted to reproduce annually. Neonates have a snout-to-vent length (SVL) of 18.8–24.4 cm (7.4–9.6 in). The mother and neonates remain together for a short period, usually for a few days until the first skin shedding of the neonates occurs.

== Conservation status ==
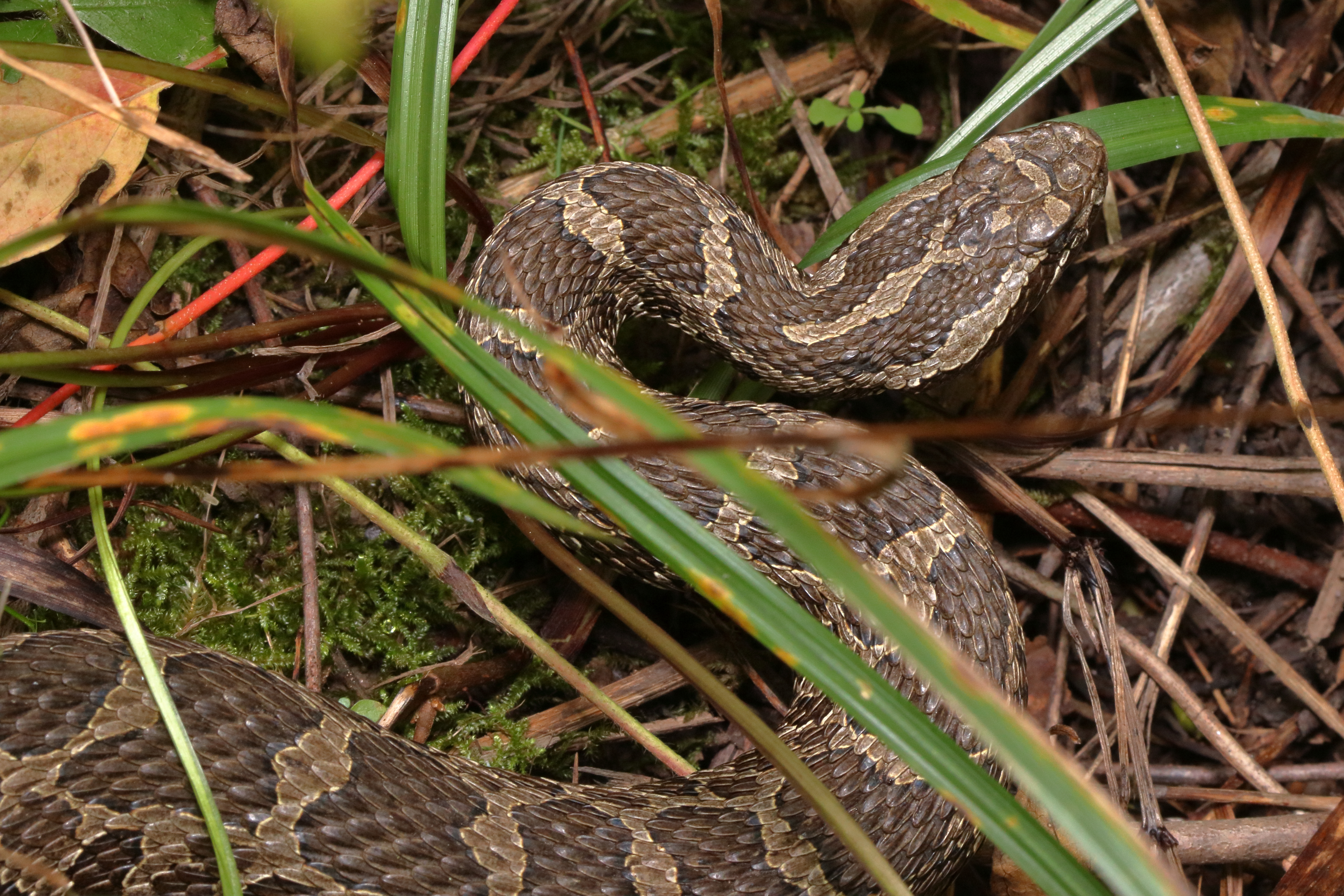
Closeup showing large scales on the top of the head, a characteristic that distinguishes the genus Sistrurus (massasauga and pigmy rattlesnakes) from the genus Crotalus (all other rattlesnakes).

The eastern massasauga is listed as a federally threatened species under the Endangered Species Act as of 2016, and is a candidate for the endangered species list. By individual state agencies, the eastern massasauga is listed as an endangered species in Illinois, Indiana, Iowa, Minnesota, Missouri (also considered extirpated), New York, Ohio, Pennsylvania, and Wisconsin. Michigan, the only state in which it is not considered endangered, lists it as "special concern".

In Pennsylvania, the species has experienced a rapid decline largely because of habitat loss. Historically, this has been due to human activity and more recently primarily from natural forest succession. By 1988, the snake had disappeared from half of the counties that constituted its historical range. A 2003–2005 survey showed only four locations in two counties with confirmed populations. It is classified as "critically imperiled" to "imperiled" in the commonwealth.

In Canada, the eastern massasauga is listed as threatened under both Ontario's Endangered Species Act, 2007, and the federal Species at Risk Act, and is protected under the Fish and Wildlife Conservation Act. It is found only near the eastern shore of Georgian Bay, the Bruce Peninsula, the North Shore of Lake Huron, Wainfleet Bog, and Ojibway Prairie. It is becoming rare in Canada due to persecution and loss of habitat and is designated as "threatened" by the Committee on the Status of Endangered Wildlife in Canada (COSEWIC), as well as the Committee on the Status of Species-at-risk in Ontario (COSSARO).

Sistrurus catenatus was listed as a species of least concern on the IUCN Red List of Threatened Species in 2007, with a note that the listing needs updating and the population trend was unknown.

It is one of many species threatened by snake fungal disease (SFD), a fungal disease found on the skin of rattlesnake and colubrid species.

== Venom ==
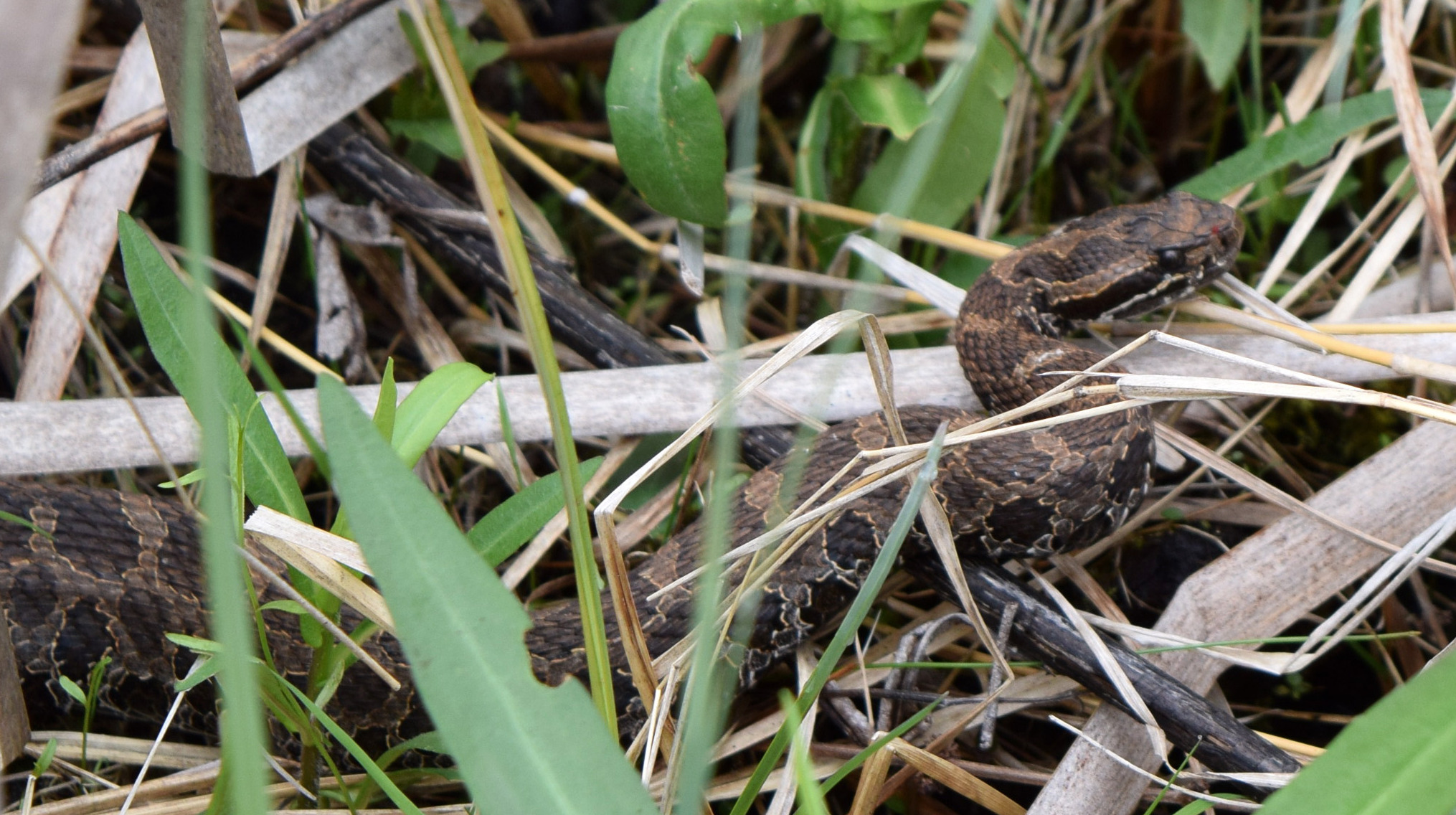
An eastern massasauga in situ

The venom of Sistrurus catenatus is a cytotoxic venom; so it destroys tissue. It also contains specialized digestive enzymes that disrupt blood flow and prevent blood clotting. Severe internal bleeding causes the death of the small animals that this snake eats. After envenomation, the rattlesnake is able to withdraw from the dangers of sharp-toothed prey animals until they are subdued and even partially digested by the action of the venom.

S. catenatus is rather shy and avoids humans when it can. Most massasauga snakebites in Ontario have occurred after people deliberately handled or accidentally stepped on one of these animals. Both of these scenarios can be prevented by avoiding hiking through areas of low visibility (in rattlesnake country) when not wearing shoes and long pants, and by leaving the snakes alone if encountered. Only two incidents of people dying from massasauga rattlesnake bites in Ontario have been recorded; in both cases, the victims did not receive proper treatment.
