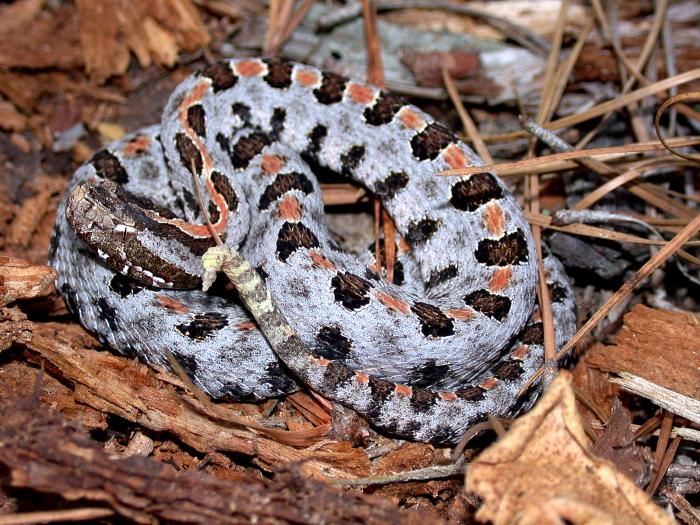
- Pygmy rattlesnake (S. miliarius).

Scientific classification
- Kingdom: Animalia
- Phylum: Chordata
- Class: Reptilia
- Order: Squamata
- Suborder: Serpentes
- Family: Viperidae
- Subfamily: Crotalinae
- Genus: Sistrurus; Garman, 1884
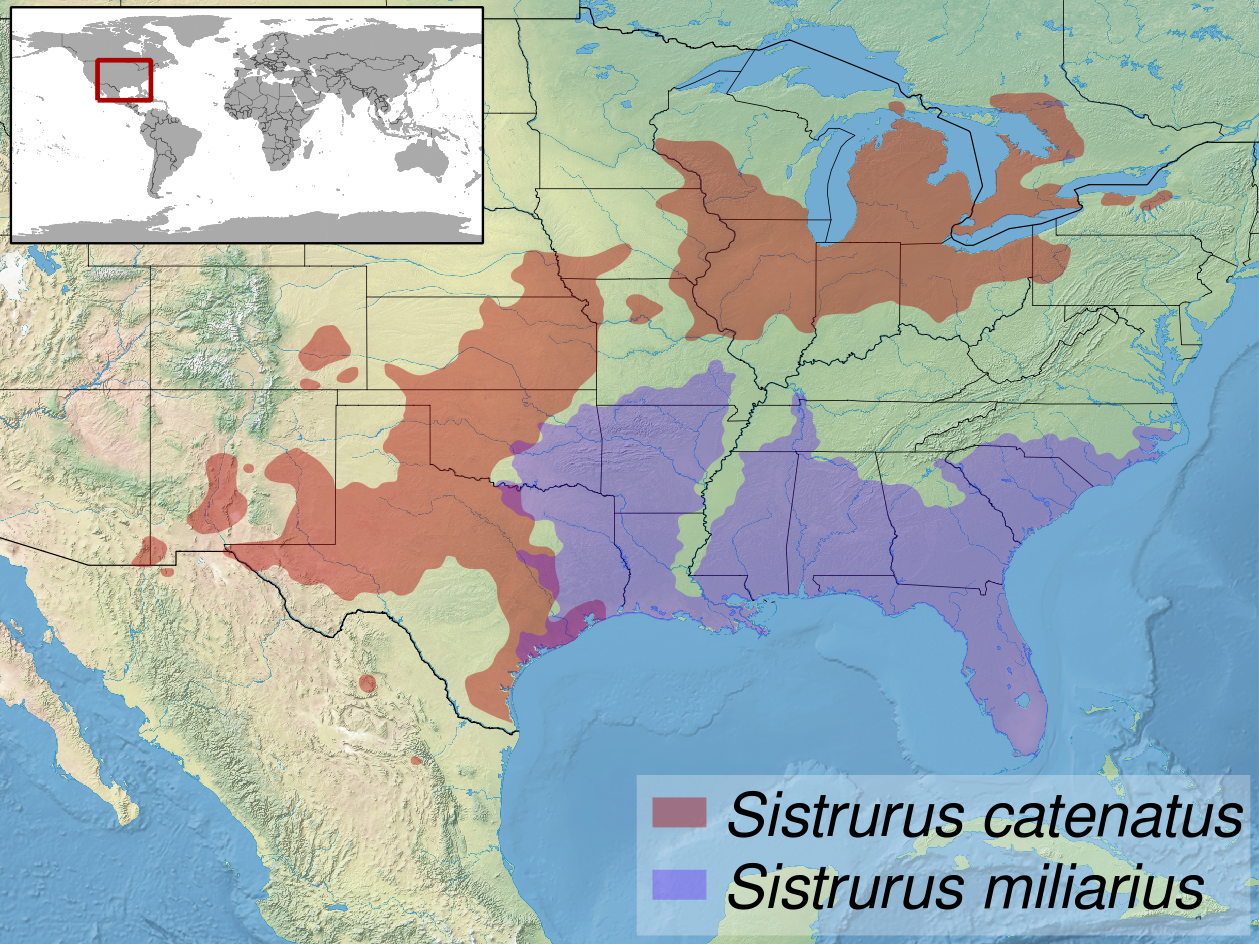
- Distribution (using two-species model)

Synonyms
- Crotalophorus Gray, 1825; Caudisona Fitzinger, 1826; Sistrurus Garman, 1884

= Sistrurus =

Genus of snakes

Common names: ground rattlesnakes, pygmy rattlesnakes, massasaugas

Sistrurus is a genus of pit vipers in the subfamily Crotalinae of the family Viperidae. The genus is endemic to Canada, the United States, and Mexico. Its name comes from the romanized forms of the Greek words for "rattle" (σείστρον, seistron) and "tail" (οὐρά, ora). It shares its root with the ancient Egyptian musical instrument, the sistrum, a type of rattle. Three species are currently recognized.

== Description ==
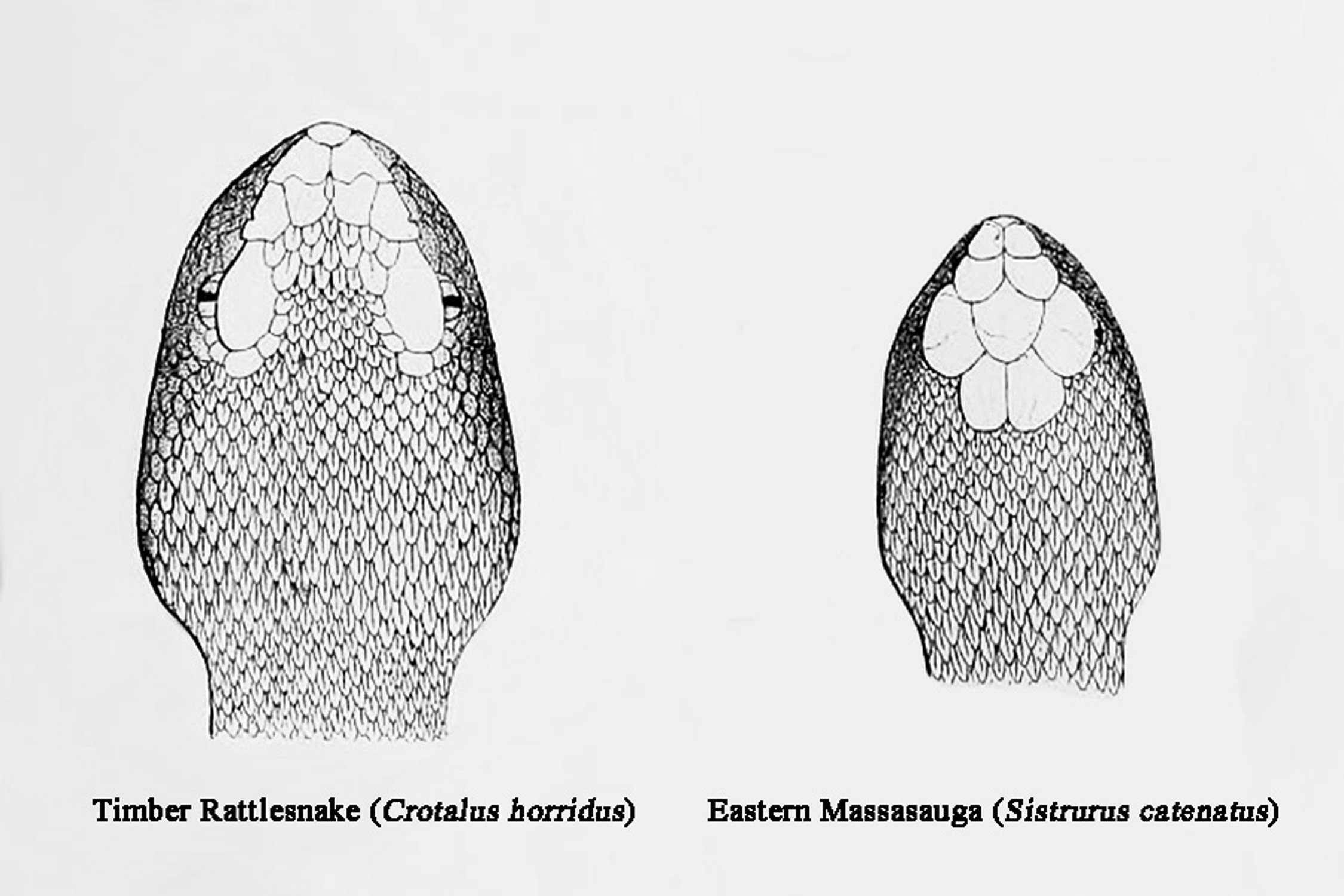
Difference in head scalation between snakes of the genus Crotalus and the genus Sistrurus.

Sistrurus species differ from the larger rattlesnakes of the genus Crotalus in a number of ways. They are smaller in size, but also their scalation is different: Sistrurus species have nine large head plates (same as Agkistrodon), whereas in Crotalus (and almost all other viperids), the head is mostly covered with a large number of smaller scales. Sistrurus species have a relatively small rattle that produces more of a high-pitched, buzzing sound than does a larger rattle, like that of Crotalus.

== Geographic range ==
Species of Sistrurus are found in Canada, the Western, Southern, and Midwestern United States, and isolated populations in southern and eastern Mexico.

== Venom ==
Although bites from Sistrurus species are regarded as less dangerous to humans than those from Crotalus rattlesnakes, primarily due to their lower venom yield, every venomous snake bite should be considered serious, and prompt medical treatment should always be sought.

== Species ==
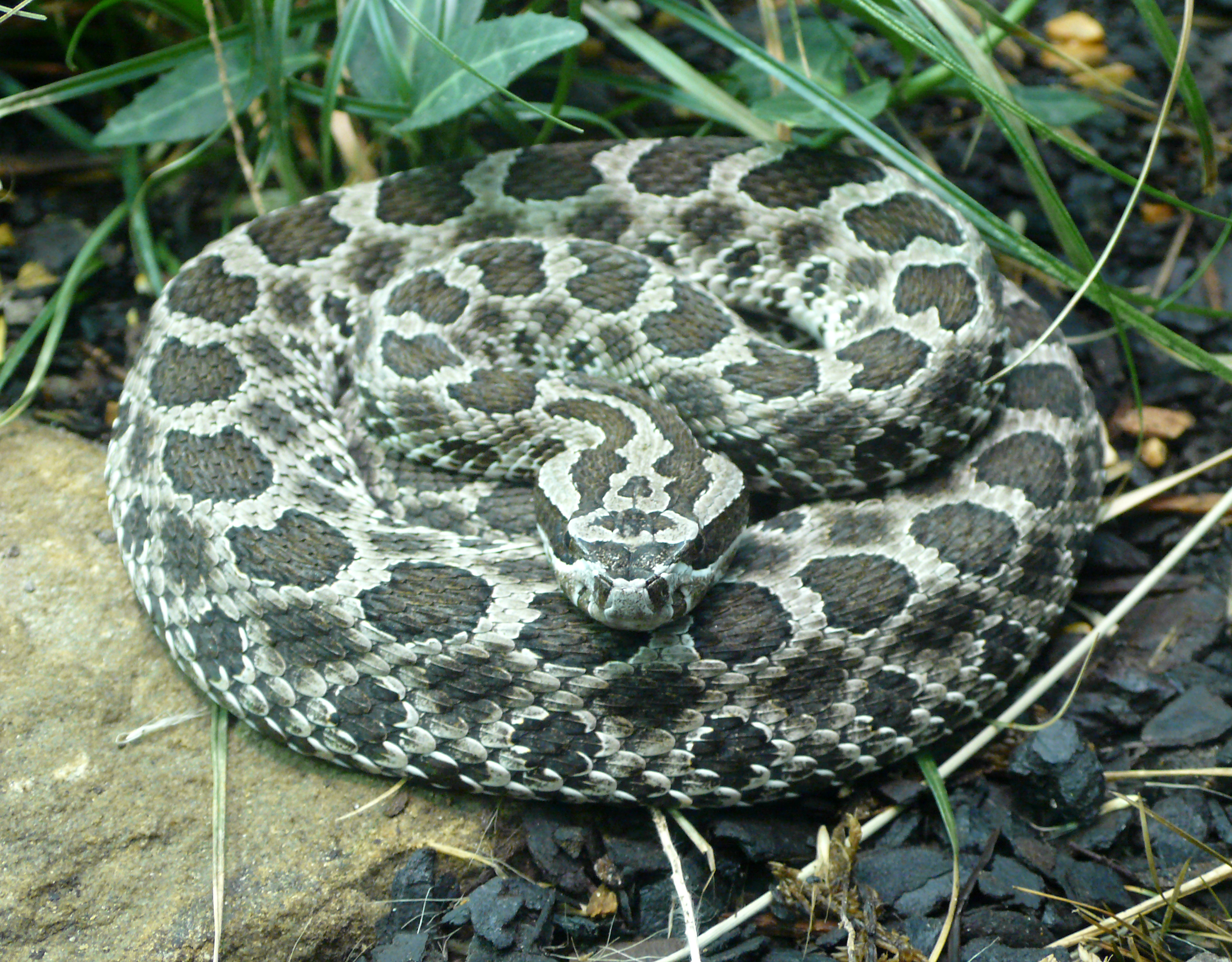
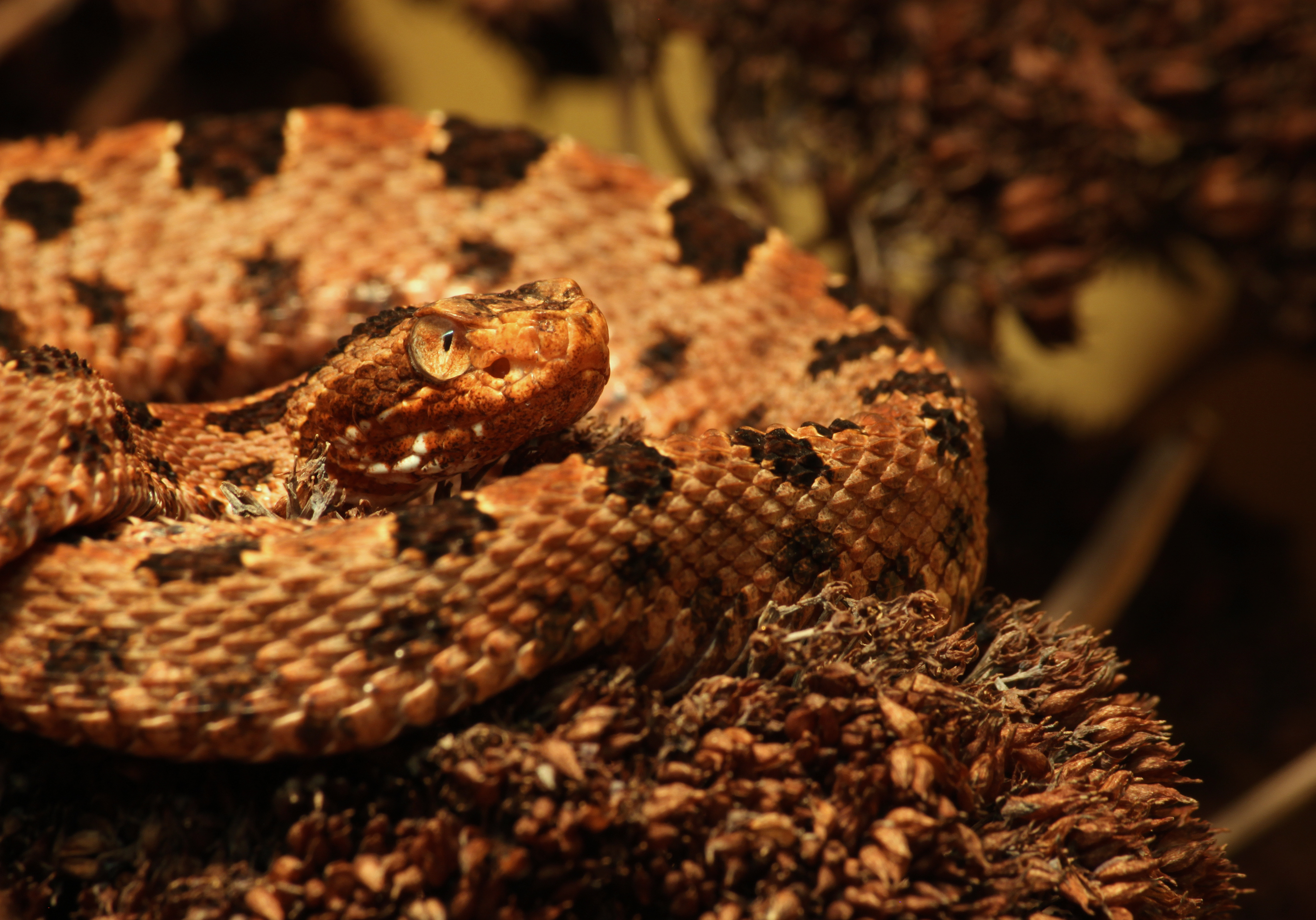
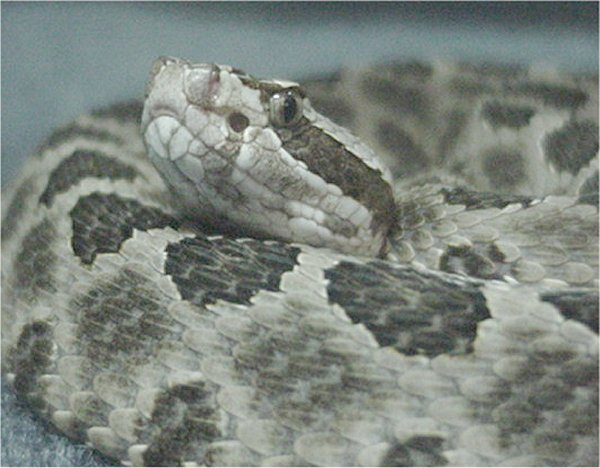
Image	Species	Taxon author	Subsp.	Common name	Geographic range
	S. catenatus	(Rafinesque, 1818)	-	eastern massasauga	It is found in the Great Lakes region from southeastern Ontario (Canada) and central and western New York west to Iowa. It occurs in various habitats ranging from swamps and marshes to grasslands, usually below 1,500 m (4,900 ft) altitude.
	S. miliarius ^{T}	(Linnaeus, 1766)	3	pygmy rattlesnake	In the Southeastern United States from eastern and southern North Carolina southward through peninsular Florida and westward to Oklahoma and East Texas. It occurs in flatwoods, sandhills, mixed forests, and floodplains, and around marshes and lakes.
	S. tergeminus	(Say, 1823)	2	western massasauga	Found throughout the Great Plains and southwestern states (from Kansas to Arizona) into disjunct populations in Mexico (Tamaulipas, southern Nuevo León, north-central Coahuila, and Samalayuca, Chihuahua). It inhabits grasslands, rocky hillsides, and woodland edges.

^{T}) Type species.
