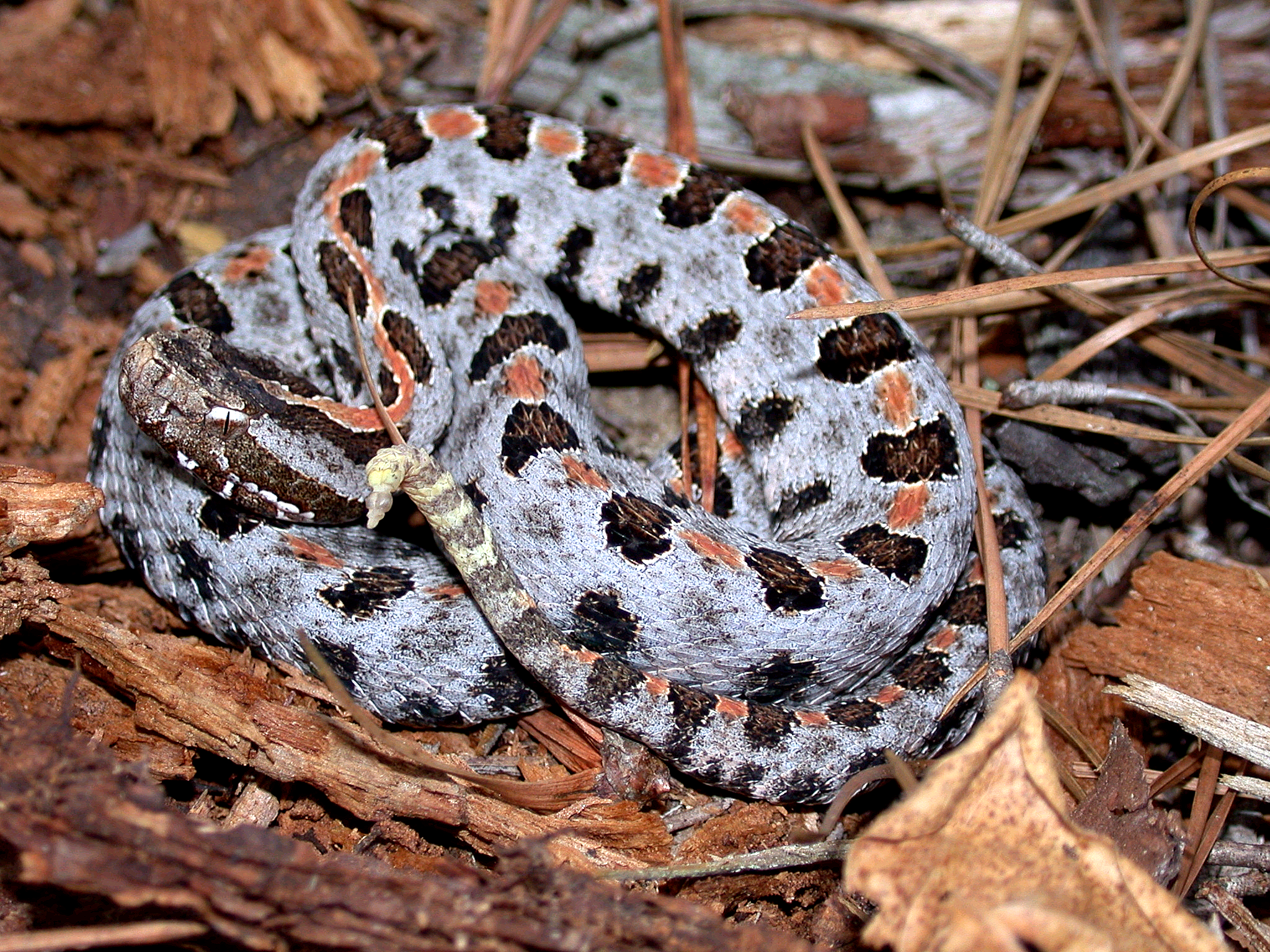

Conservation status
- Least Concern (IUCN 3.1)

Scientific classification
- Kingdom: Animalia
- Phylum: Chordata
- Class: Reptilia
- Order: Squamata
- Suborder: Serpentes
- Family: Viperidae
- Genus: Sistrurus
- Species: S. miliarius

Binomial name
- Sistrurus miliarius (Linnaeus, 1766)
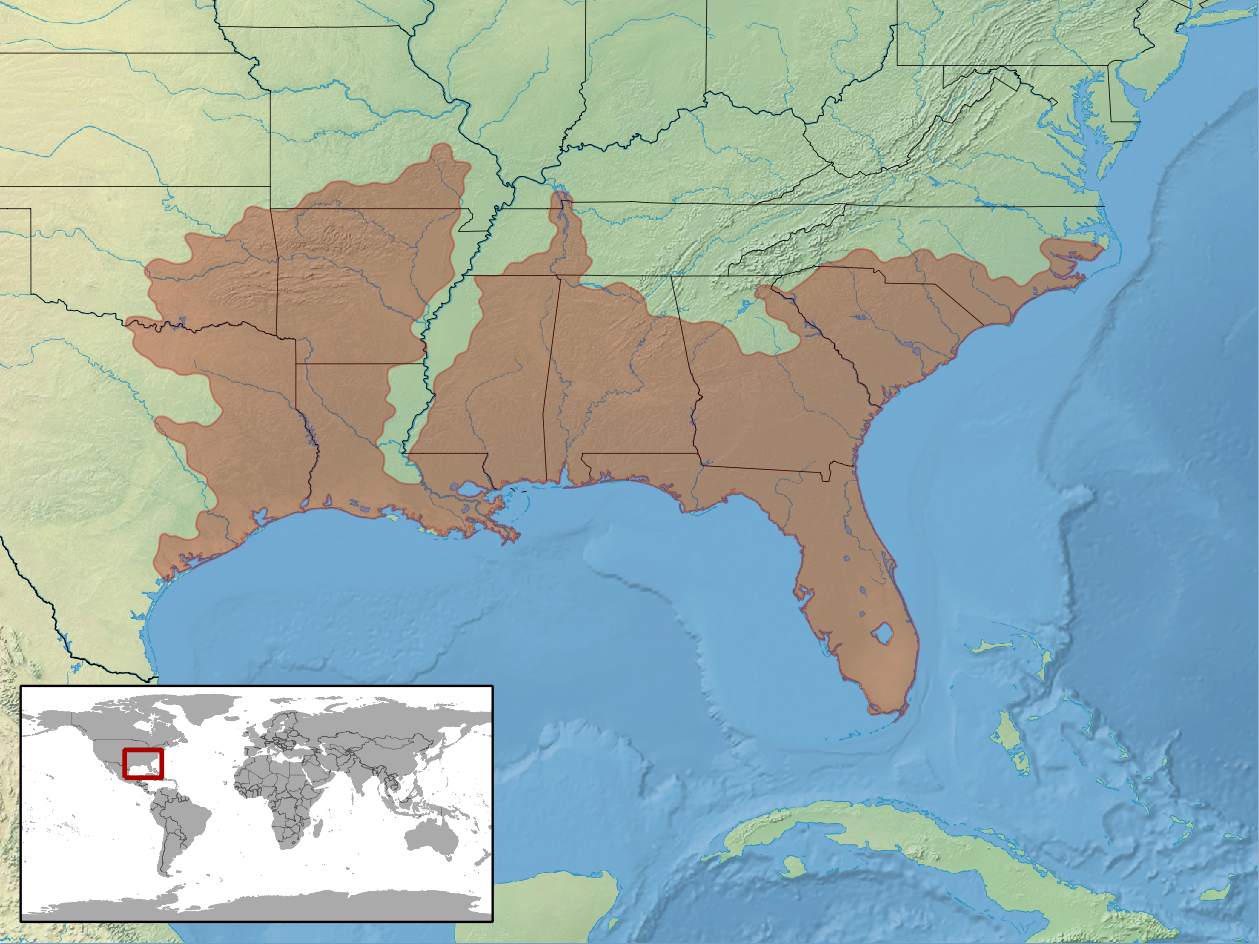

Synonyms
- List: [Crotalus] miliarius Linnaeus, 1766; Crotalus miliarius — Palisot de Beauvois, 1799; C[rotalophorus]. miliarius — Gray, 1825; C[audisona]. miliaria — Fitzinger, 1826; Crotalophorus miliarius — Holbrook, 1842; C[rotalus]. (Crotalophorus) miliarius — Jan, 1863; [Sistrurus] miliarius — Garman, 1884; Sistrurus miliarius — Boulenger, 1896; Sistrurus miliarius miliarius — Gloyd, 1935

= Sistrurus miliarius =

Species of reptile

Common names: pygmy rattlesnake, eastern pygmy rattlesnake, ground rattlesnake, leaf rattler, death rattler, more.

Sistrurus miliarius, commonly called the pygmy rattlesnake, is a species of venomous snake in the subfamily Crotalinae (pit vipers) of the family Viperidae. The species is endemic to the Southeastern United States. Three subspecies are currently recognized.

== Description ==
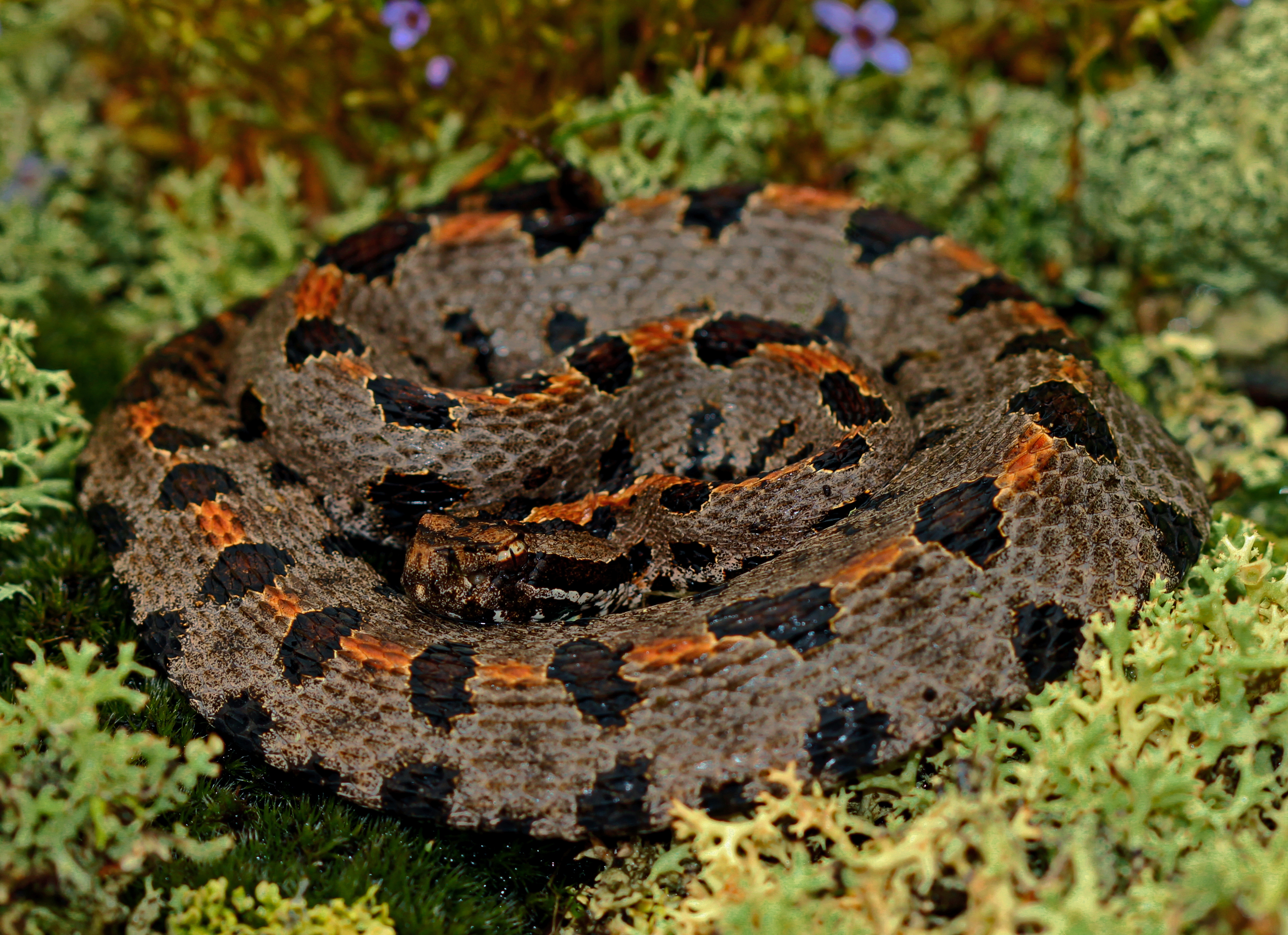
Western pygmy rattlesnake (Sistrurus miliarius streckeri), Wayne County, Missouri (13 April 2018)

Sistrurus miliarius is a small species, but bulky in width, with adults usually growing to 40–60 cm (16–24 in) in total length (including tail). It is the smallest species of rattlesnake on the North American continent. The maximum reported total length is 78.8 cm (31.0 in) (Klauber, 1972). Snellings and Collins (1997) reported a specimen of S. m. barbouri measuring 80.3 cm (31.6 in), but it had been in captivity for over 12 years. The largest S. m. barbouri reported by Gloyd (1940) was a specimen measuring 63.8 cm (25.1 in) from St. Petersburg, Florida. Shine (1978) suggested that in some populations, males may be larger than females, but a later study by Bishop et al. (1996) did not find sexual dimorphism of any kind in a population in Volusia County, Florida. It is currently theorized that the lack of sexual dimorphism in the species is due to the fact that both males and females experience selective pressures to be of a larger size.

At midbody, the rows of dorsal scales usually number 23. The dorsal pattern consists of a series of oval or subcircular spots with somewhat regular edges. The spots on the flanks are mostly round and not much higher than they are wide. Belly pigmentation towards the rear is more limited to indistinct blotches found on pairs of adjacent scales. The juvenile color pattern is similar to the adult, although it may be paler or more vividly marked, and the tip of the tail is yellow.

== Common names ==
Common names for Sistrurus miliarius include pygmy rattlesnake, ground rattlesnake, hog-nosed rattlesnake, little rattlesnake, miliar(y) rattlesnake, North American smaller rattlesnake, oak-leaf rattler, pygmy ground rattlesnake, small rattlesnake, southeastern ground rattlesnake, southern ground rattlesnake, southern pygmy rattlesnake, spotted rattler, spotted rattlesnake, southern rattlesnake. Older common names might include bastard rattlesnake, nipple snake, Carolina ground rattlesnake, brick red rattlesnake, Carolina pygmy rattlesnake, Catesby's small snake, dwarf rattlesnake, eastern pygmy rattlesnake, grey rattlesnake, and ground rattler (Garman, 1887).

== Etymology ==
The specific name, miliarius, is derived from Latin and means millet or millet-like, perhaps referring to the blotched patterns described in the species.

== Geographic range ==
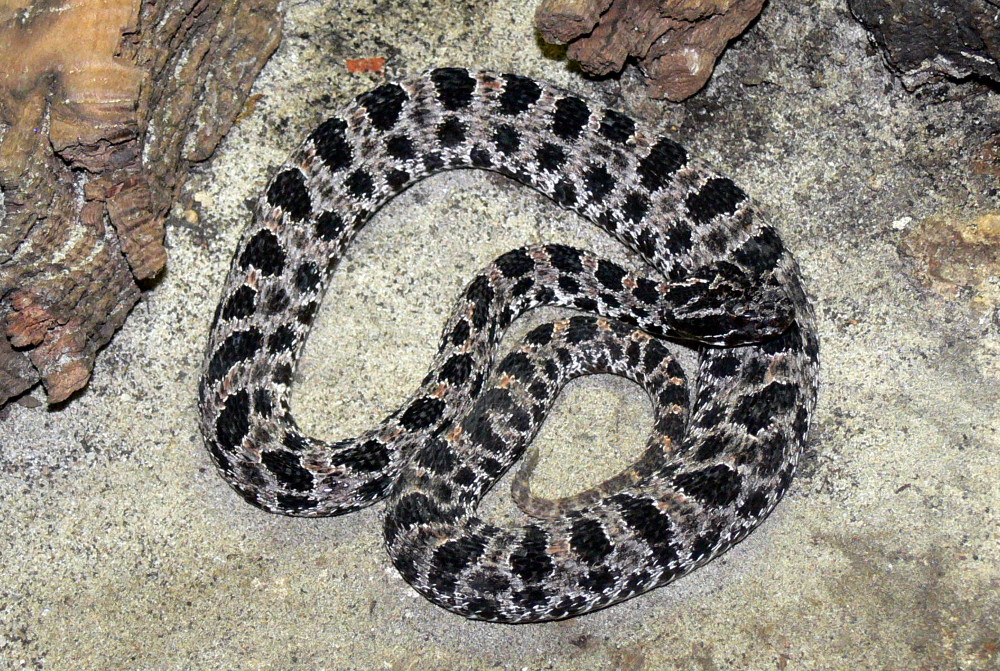
Dusky pygmy rattlesnake (S. m. barbouri)

Sistrurus miliarius is found in the Southeastern United States from southern and eastern North Carolina, south through peninsular Florida and west to East Texas and Oklahoma. The type locality given is "Carolina". Schmidt (1953) proposed that this be restricted to "Charleston, South Carolina".

== Habitat ==
Sistrurus miliarius primarily inhabits flatwoods, sandhills, longleaf pine savannahs, mixed scrub oak forests, and floodplains throughout the sandhills and coastal plains regions, and is also found near lakes and marshes. Due to a need for cover, pygmy rattlesnakes may prefer more densely vegetated areas.

== Conservation status ==
The species Sistrurus miliaris is classified as "least concern" on the IUCN Red List of Threatened Species. Species are listed as such due to their wide distribution, presumed large population, or because the population is unlikely to be declining fast enough to qualify for listing in a more threatened category. The population trend is stable; it was assessed in 2007. This species is not protected by South Carolina or Georgia state law, but pygmy rattlesnakes are protected in North Carolina and Tennessee. Snake fungal disease (SFD) is caused by the fungus Ophidiomyces ophiodiicola and its documentation in pygmy rattlesnakes has risen sharply in the past decade being a major cause of death. Snakes with the disease are usually subject to poor body condition and experience a decrease in reproductive success. Though prevalent among the species, pygmy rattlesnakes have been seen to overcome snake fungal disease in the field. Even affected females have been found to still give birth to viable young.

== Behavior ==
Sistrurus miliarius is usually seen in the summer sunning itself or crossing the road late in the day. The tiny rattle makes a buzzing sound that can only be heard from a few feet away. The unusually small rattles of the pygmy rattlesnake is suggestive of the early stages of rattle evolution. Some individuals are very aggressive and strike furiously, while others seem lethargic and do not even attempt to rattle. Some research has shown that a larger portion of these rattlesnakes are usually reluctant to bite. It does not dig its own burrows, but rather uses those dug by small rodents or gopher tortoises (Gopherus polyphemus). These snakes typically don't move far from their "home burrows" and studies have shown that males may move farther than females. Pygmy Rattlesnakes are generally solitary but become social only during the breeding season. During this time, male pygmy rattlesnakes become agonistic towards each other, with fighting, challenge displays, and mate-guarding behavior all being observed.

== Diet ==
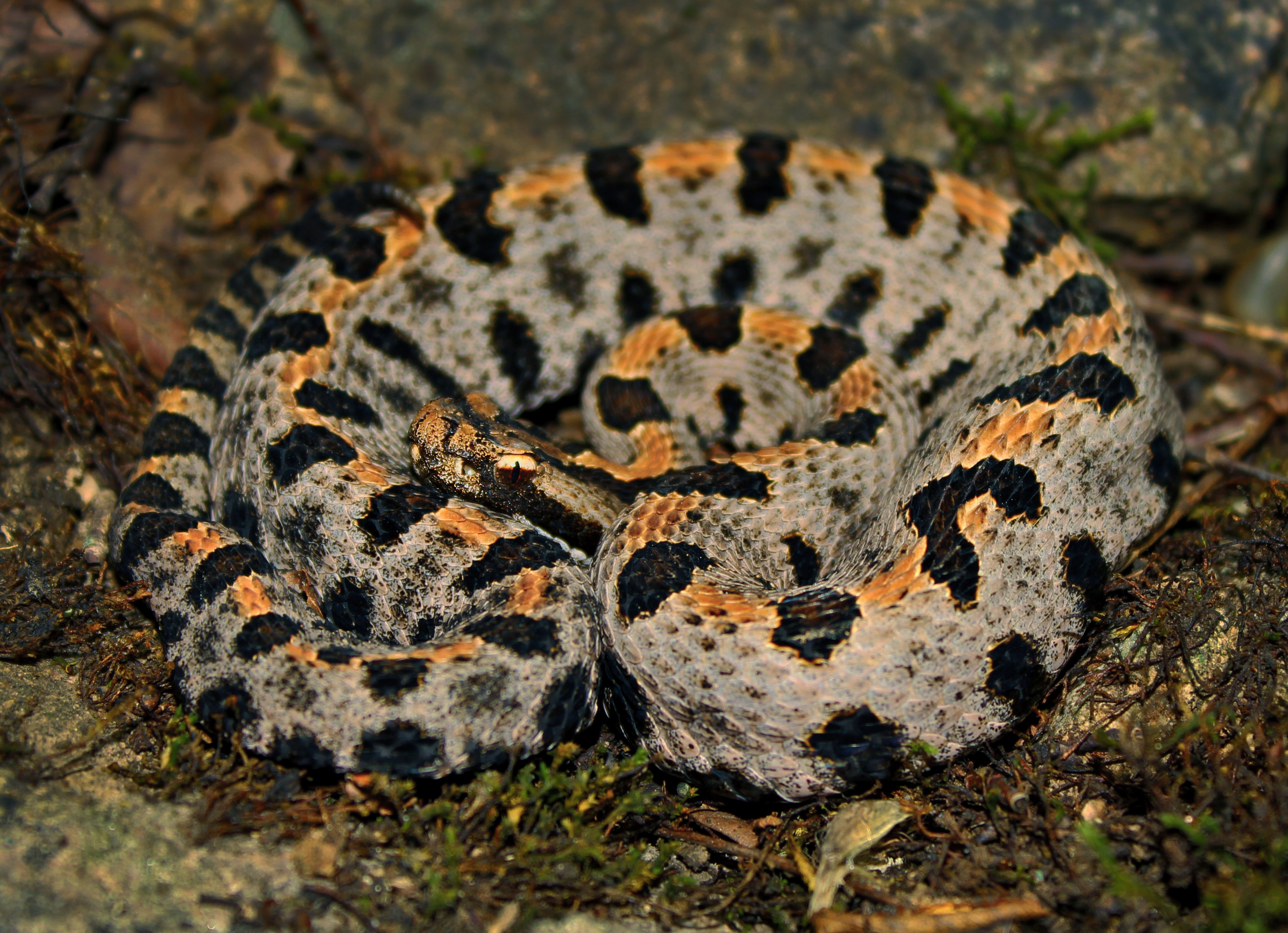
Western pygmy rattlesnake (S. m. streckeri), Wayne County, Missouri (16 July 2016)

The diet of Sistrurus miliarius includes small mammals and birds, lizards, insects, and frogs, as well as other snakes. The pygmy rattlesnake also includes giant desert centipedes in its diet, which it hunts by active pursuit, grabbing and flipping the centipedes around while simultaneously injecting venom to prevent injury by the victim. It also ambushes lizards such as skinks by using its tail as a lure, as is common in many other species of vipers. Caudal luring becomes less effective for adults, as the prey size and type changes. The feeding strategy becomes sit-and-wait, with individuals remaining in a coiled position for days at a time. The pygmy rattlesnake may change its foraging behaviors, such as prestrike, strike, and poststrike, to be most suitable for the prey item it is going after.

== Reproduction ==
These snakes are ovoviviparous, meaning they give birth to live young. Mating occurs in fall or spring, during which males detect chemical cues from females and engage in nonlethal disputes with other males. Females usually have between 3 and 13 young between July and September. Young rattlesnakes become sexually mature at 2-4 years, with females having a gestation period of 3-5 months.

== Venom ==
Since Sistrurus miliarius is unable to produce much venom, it is unlikely to be able to deliver a fatal bite to a human adult.

This snake produces cytotoxic venom that is strongly hemorrhagic and tissue toxic, but devoid of any neurotoxins. The venom was the basis for the development of the drug eptifibatide, which is used to prevent clotting during a heart attack. The venom is somewhat different in that it contains substantial amounts of serotonin and related tryptamine compounds.

== Subspecies ==
Subspecies	Taxon author	Common name	Geographic range
S. m. barbouri	Gloyd, 1935	Dusky pygmy rattlesnake	Extreme southern South Carolina through southern Georgia, all of Florida, west through southern Alabama and southeastern Mississippi
S. m. miliarius	(Linnaeus, 1766)	Carolina pygmy rattlesnake	Extreme southern South Carolina, northwards into eastern North Carolina as far as Hyde County and west through central Georgia and central Alabama
S. m. streckeri	Gloyd, 1935	Western pygmy rattlesnake	Mississippi (except for southeast of the Pearl River Valley), west through Louisiana into East Texas, and north into southeastern Oklahoma, Arkansas, southern Missouri, and southwestern Tennessee

== Gallery ==
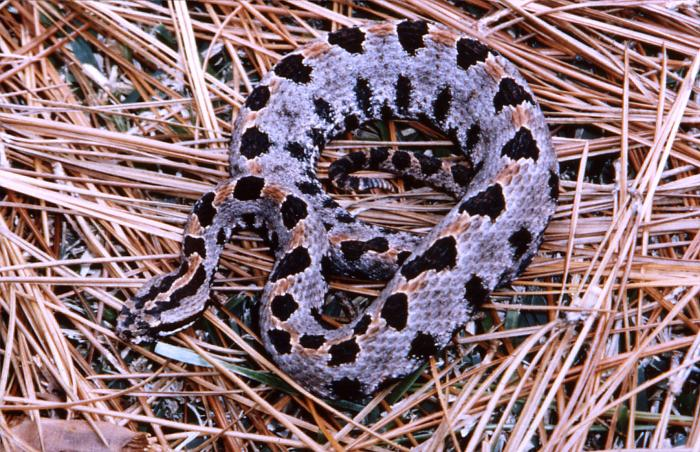
Carolina pygmy rattlesnake (S. m. miliarius)

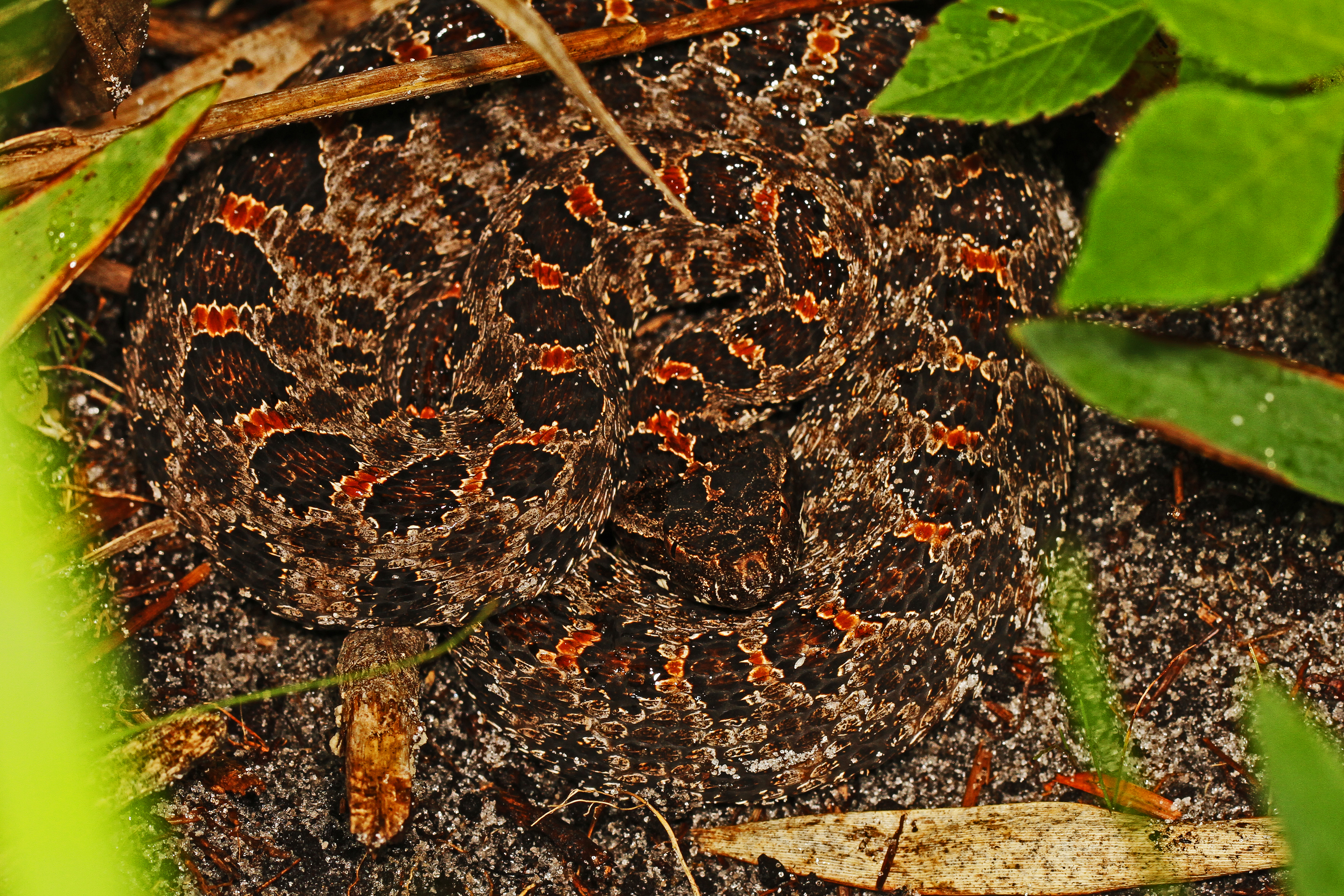
Dusky pygmy rattlesnake (S. m. barbouri), Hendry Co., Florida (3 May 2013)

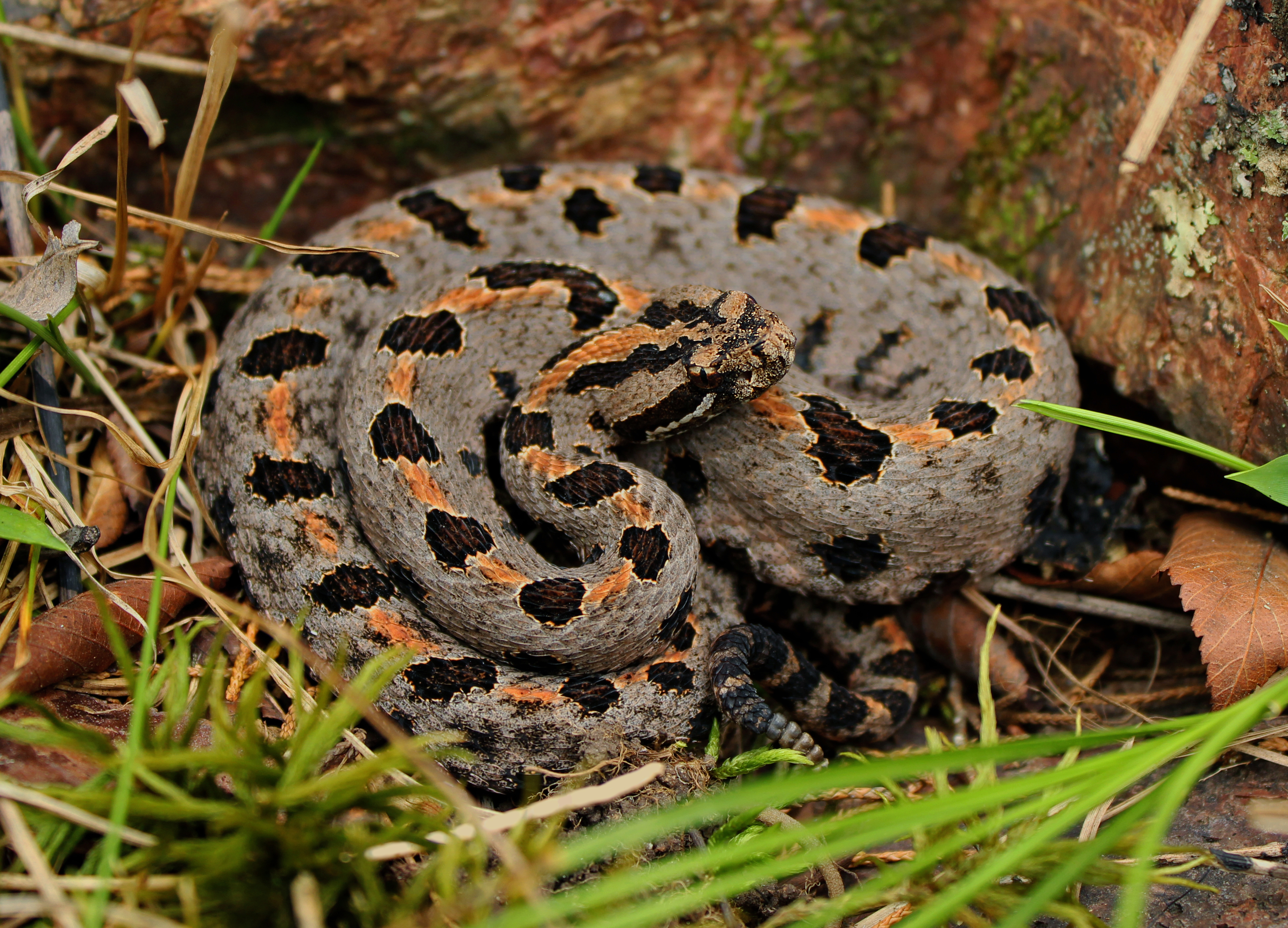
Western pygmy rattlesnake (S. m. streckeri), Wayne Co., Missouri (28 August 2015)
