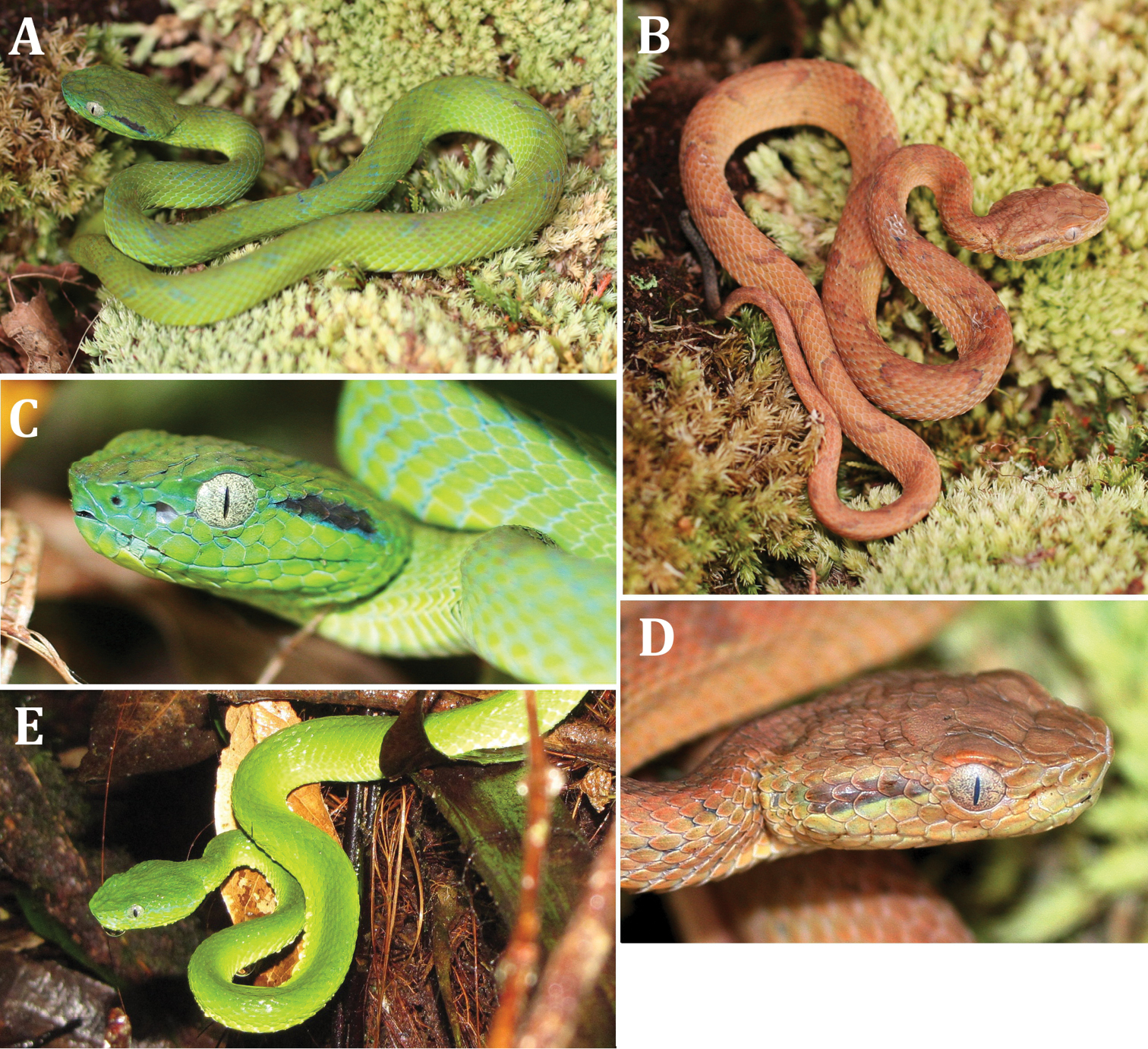
- A. Green-phase juvenile. B. Brown-phase juvenile. C. Close-up of head. D. Close-up of head. E. Female.

Scientific classification
- Kingdom: Animalia
- Phylum: Chordata
- Class: Reptilia
- Order: Squamata
- Suborder: Serpentes
- Family: Viperidae
- Genus: Bothriechis
- Species: B. guifarroi

Binomial name
- Bothriechis guifarroi Townsend, Medina-Flores, Wilson, Jadin & Austin, 2013

= Bothriechis guifarroi =

Species of snake

Bothriechis guifarroi is a species of green palm pit vipers discovered in 2010 in the Texiguat Wildlife Refuge, in Northern Honduras. Bothriechis guifarroi joins two other species of the genus Bothriechis, B. marchi and B. thalassinus, found in the Chortís Highlands of Honduras.

Its color pattern and scalation is similar to other Honduran palm pitvipers, but genetic analysis reveals it to be more closely related to the B. lateralis and B. nigroviridis species more than 600 km to the southeast, in the mountains of Costa Rica and Panama.

== Etymology ==
B. guifarroi was named after Honduran environmental activist Mario Guifarro. Guifarro was killed while on a conservation mission in the Tawahka territory of eastern Honduras in 2007.

== Description ==
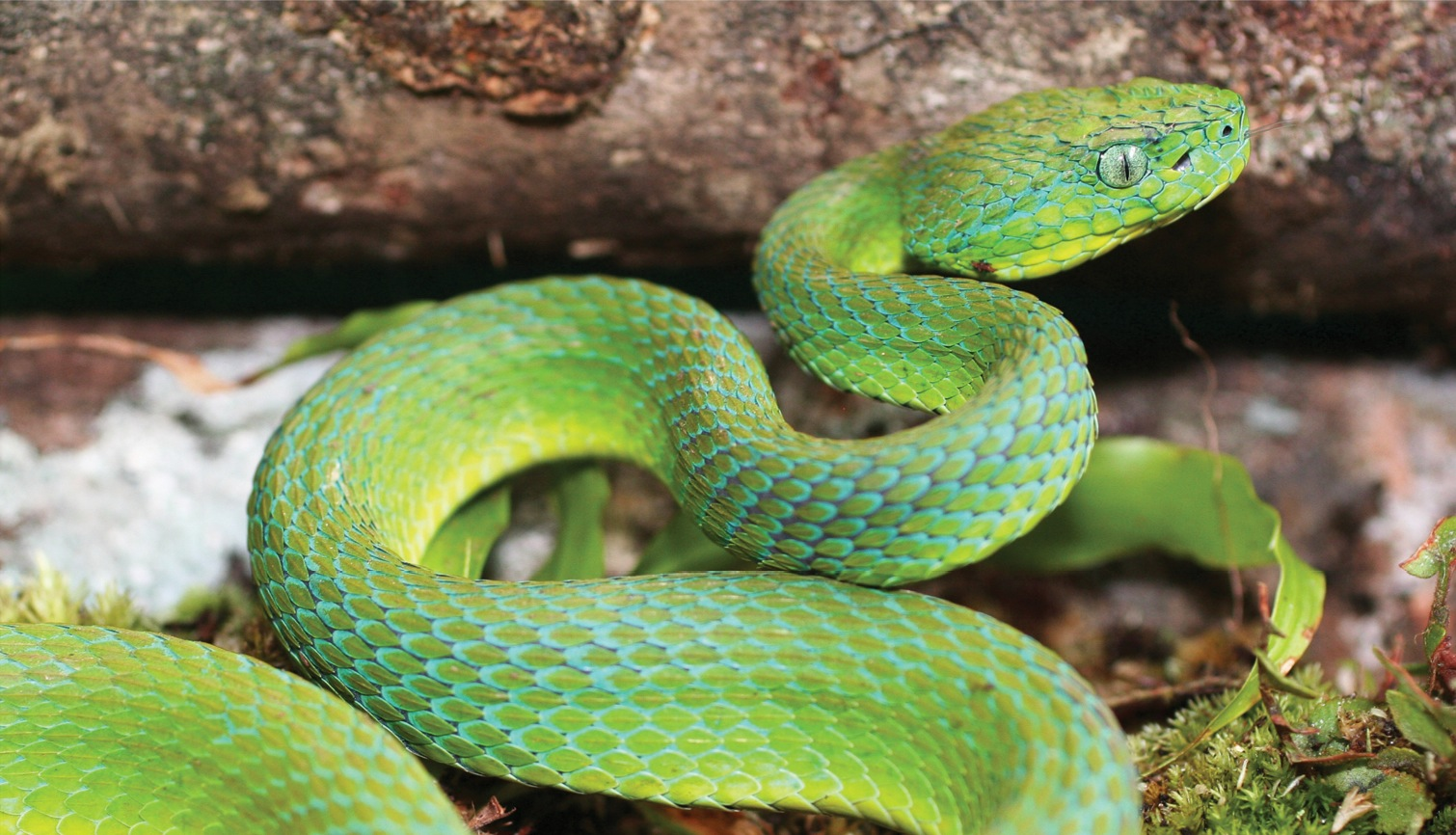
Holotype

Adult B. guifarroi are brightly colored green, with a yellowish hue towards the ventral side. The juveniles have a green phase and a brown phase, before acquiring the adult coloration. The holotype (adult) measured 734 mm total length, with a tail length of 136 mm.

== Distribution ==
The population of B guifarroi was found at elevations between 1015 m and 1450 m in western Cordillera Nombre de Dios, inside the Texiguat Wildlife Refuge, Honduras. More specifically, specimens were found in the Premontane Wet Forest and Lower Montane Wet Forest formations of Holdridge.

== Habitat ==
B. guifarroi has been found in rainforest and cloud forests at elevations above 1000 m.

Habitat in the vicinity of the type locality

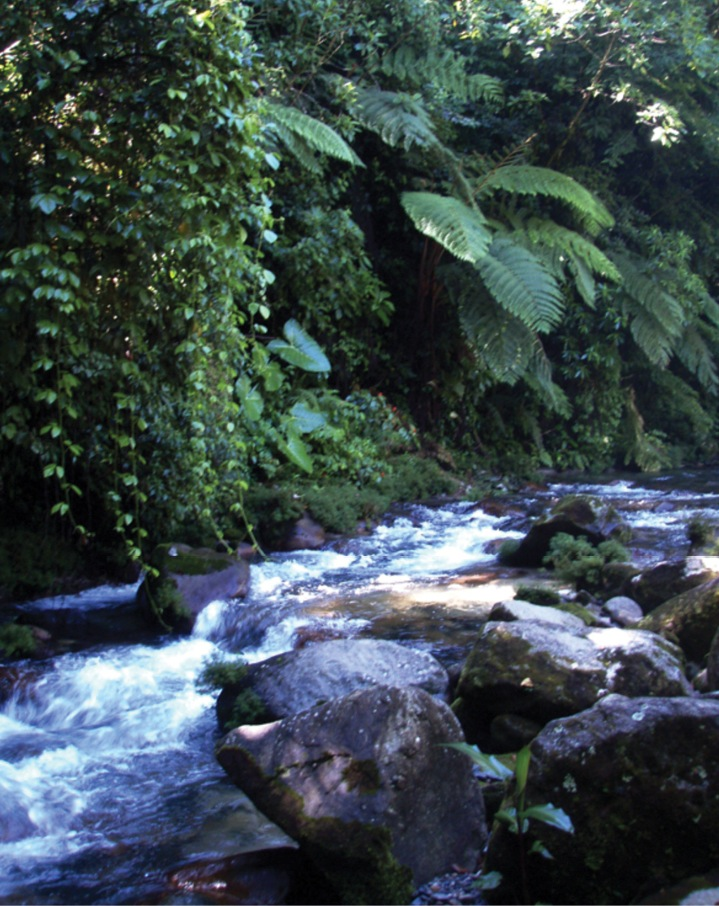
Riparian vegetation, 1015 m elevation

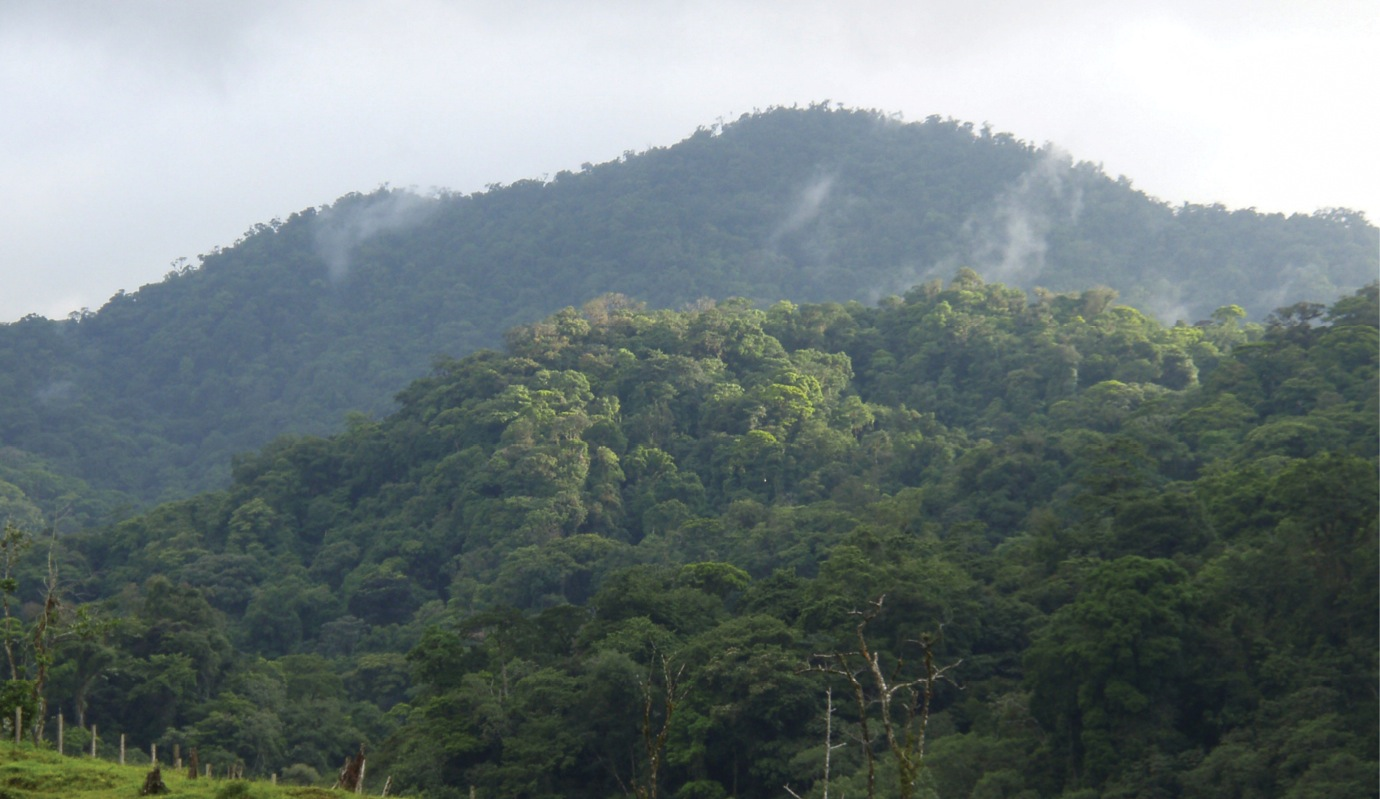
Premontane rainforest, 1030 m elevation

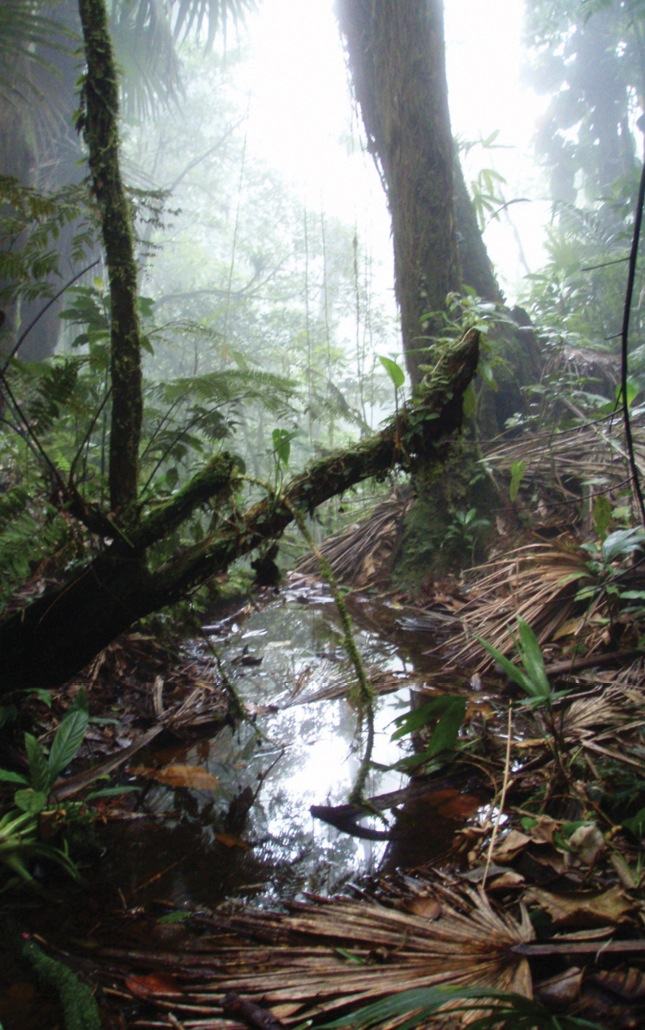
Seepage pond, 1380 m elevation

Photographs from the vicinity of the type locality in La Liberación, Refugio de Vida Silvestre Texígaut, Honduras, taken by J. H. Townsend and distributed under the Creative Commons Attribution License 3.0.

== Status ==
The 2013 study describing the species recommended its immediate classification as Critically Endangered due to limited knowledge of its population and distribution, and potential for human reduction or degradation to its habitat. It also recommended immediate consideration for CITES protection, given its likely demand and exploitation by the pet trade.
