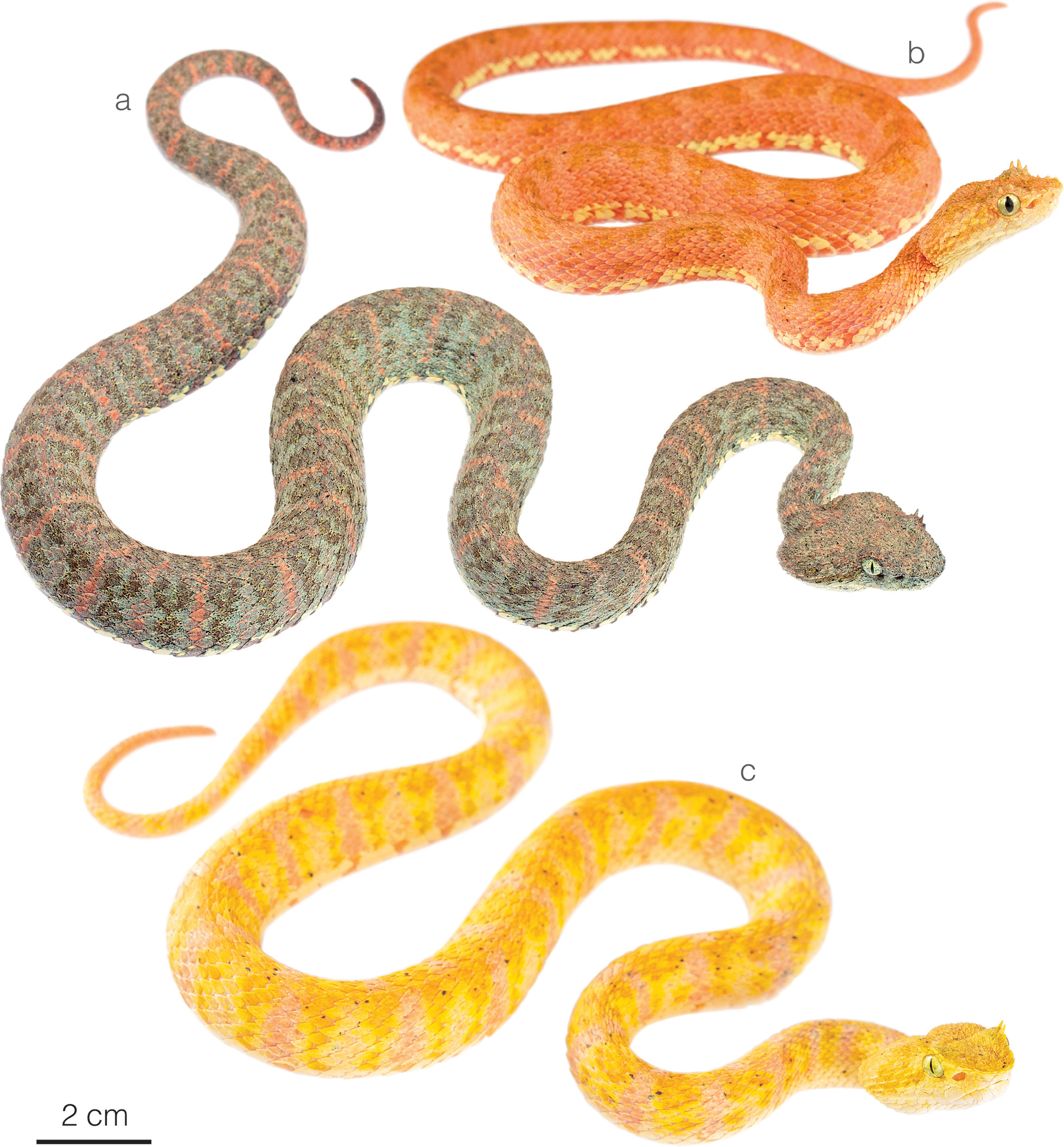
- Specimens from Esmeraldas, Ecuador

Scientific classification
- Kingdom: Animalia
- Phylum: Chordata
- Class: Reptilia
- Order: Squamata
- Suborder: Serpentes
- Family: Viperidae
- Genus: Bothriechis
- Species: B. rahimi

Binomial name
- Bothriechis rahimi Arteaga et al. 2024

= Bothriechis rahimi =

Species of snake

Bothriechis rahimi is a species of pit viper described in 2024. It is known from the Chocó biome of southwestern Colombia and extreme northwestern Ecuador.

Bothriechis rahimi is an arboreal snake occurring in evergreen lowland forests, usually not far from the coast. It can grow to a total length of 336 mm (13.2 in) in males and 494 mm (19.4 in) in females.

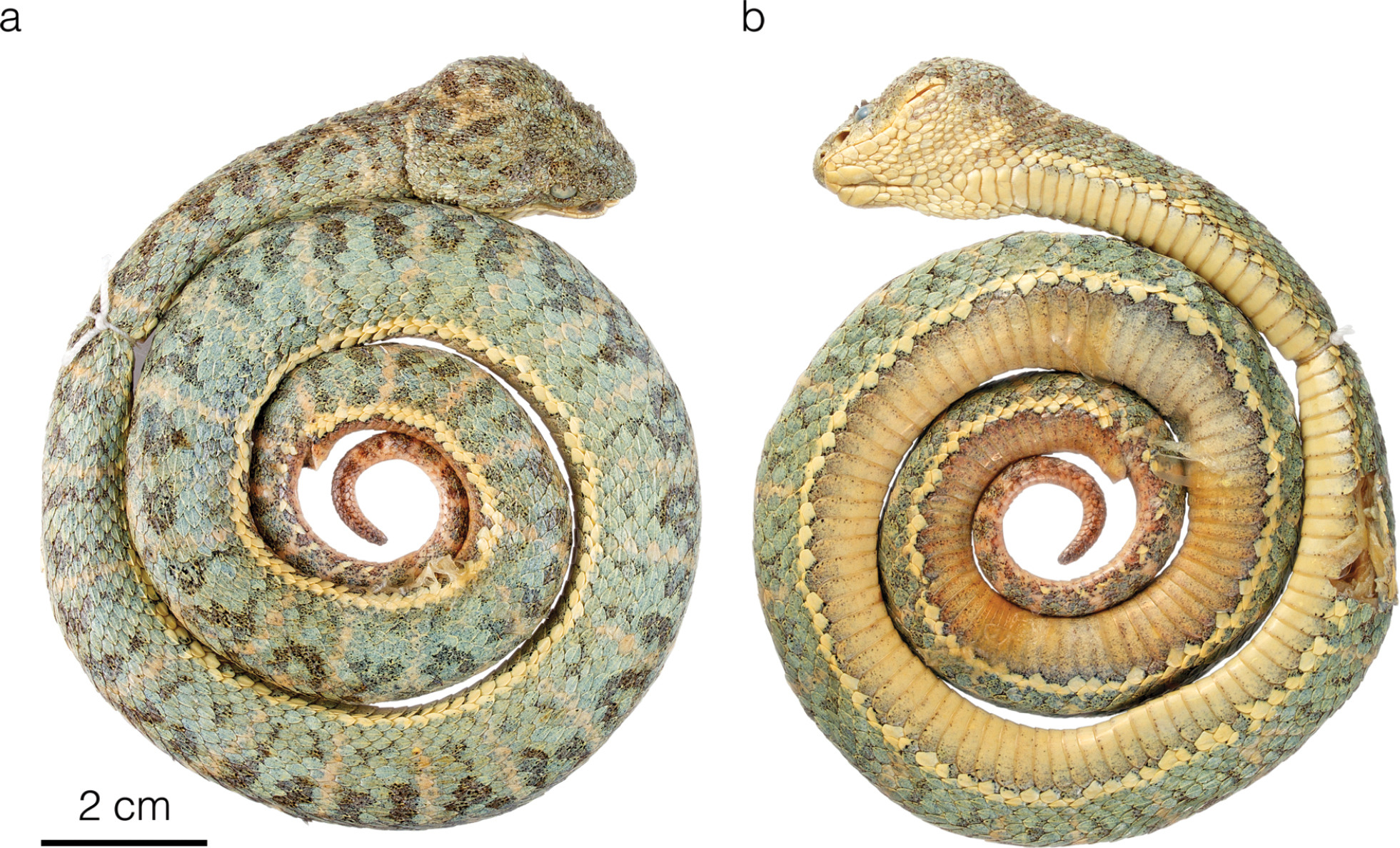
Holotype specimen (adult female)
