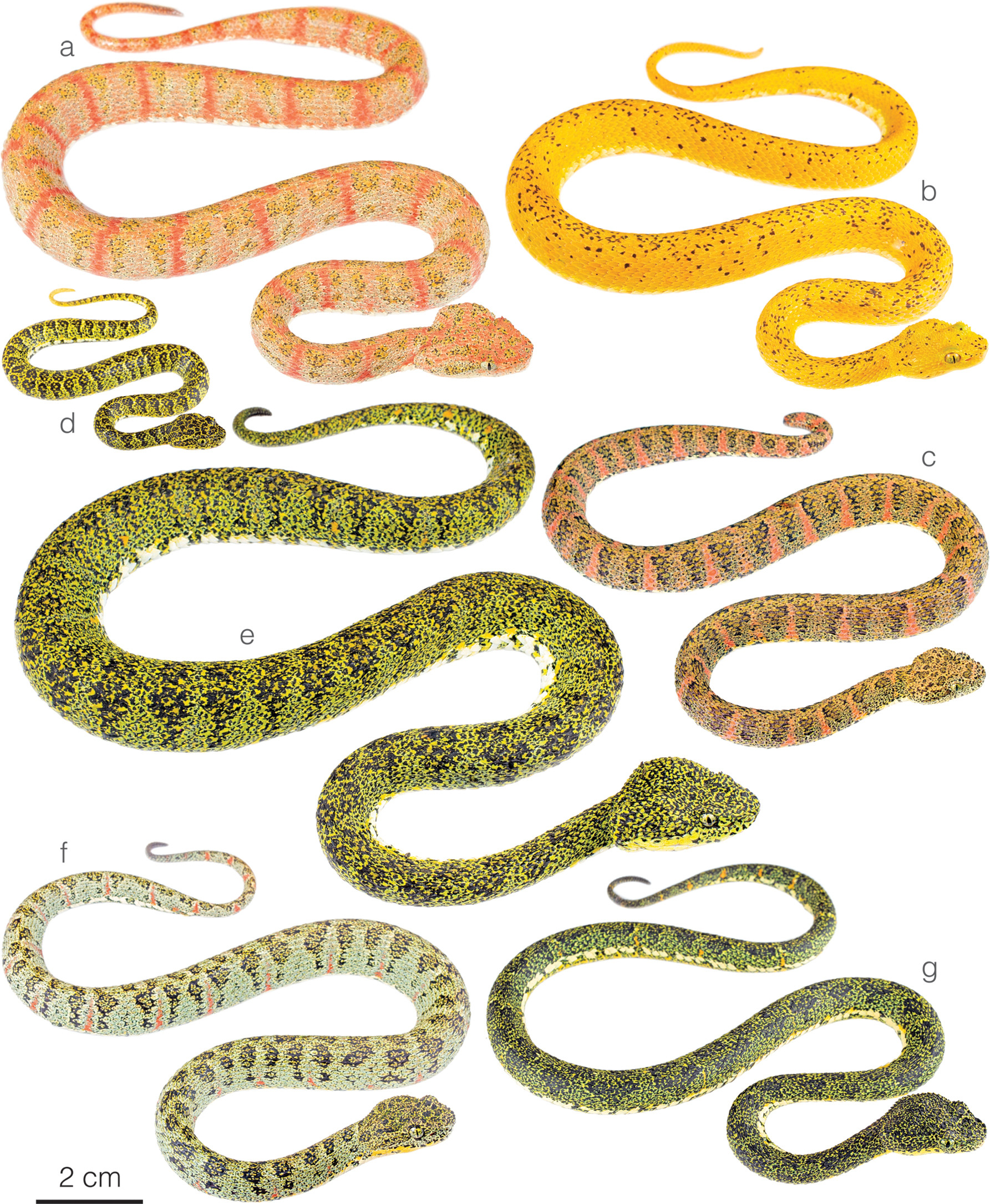
- Specimens from Ecuador

Scientific classification
- Kingdom: Animalia
- Phylum: Chordata
- Class: Reptilia
- Order: Squamata
- Suborder: Serpentes
- Family: Viperidae
- Genus: Bothriechis
- Species: B. hussaini

Binomial name
- Bothriechis hussaini Arteaga et al. 2024

= Bothriechis hussaini =

Species of snake

Bothriechis hussaini is a species of pit viper described in 2024.

Holotype specimen (adult male)

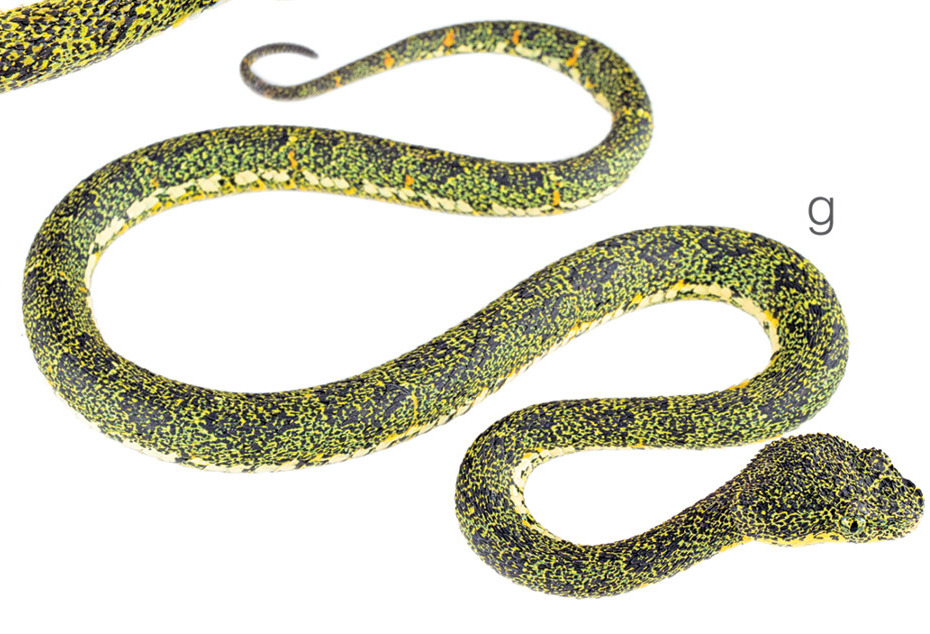
In life

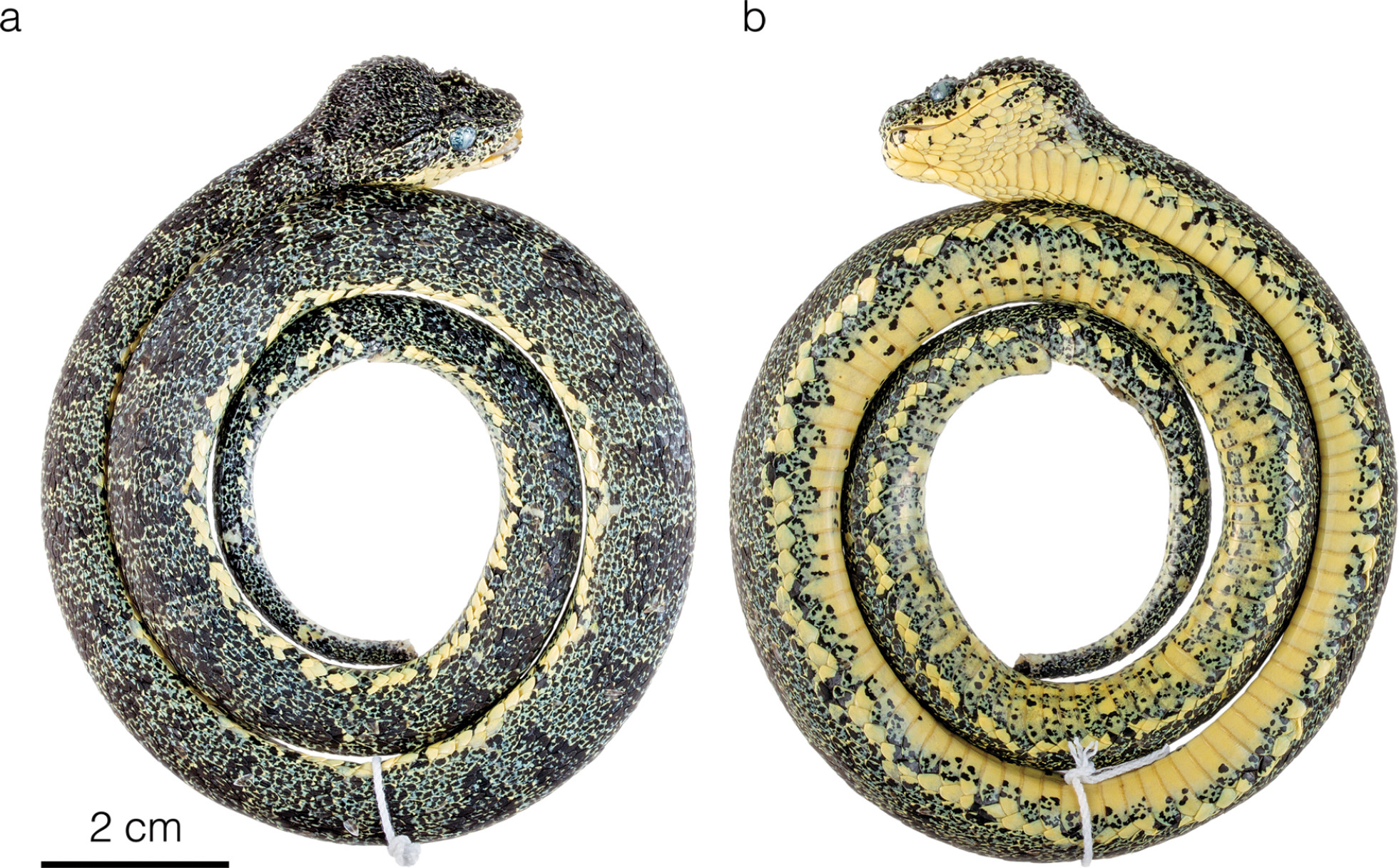
Preserved
