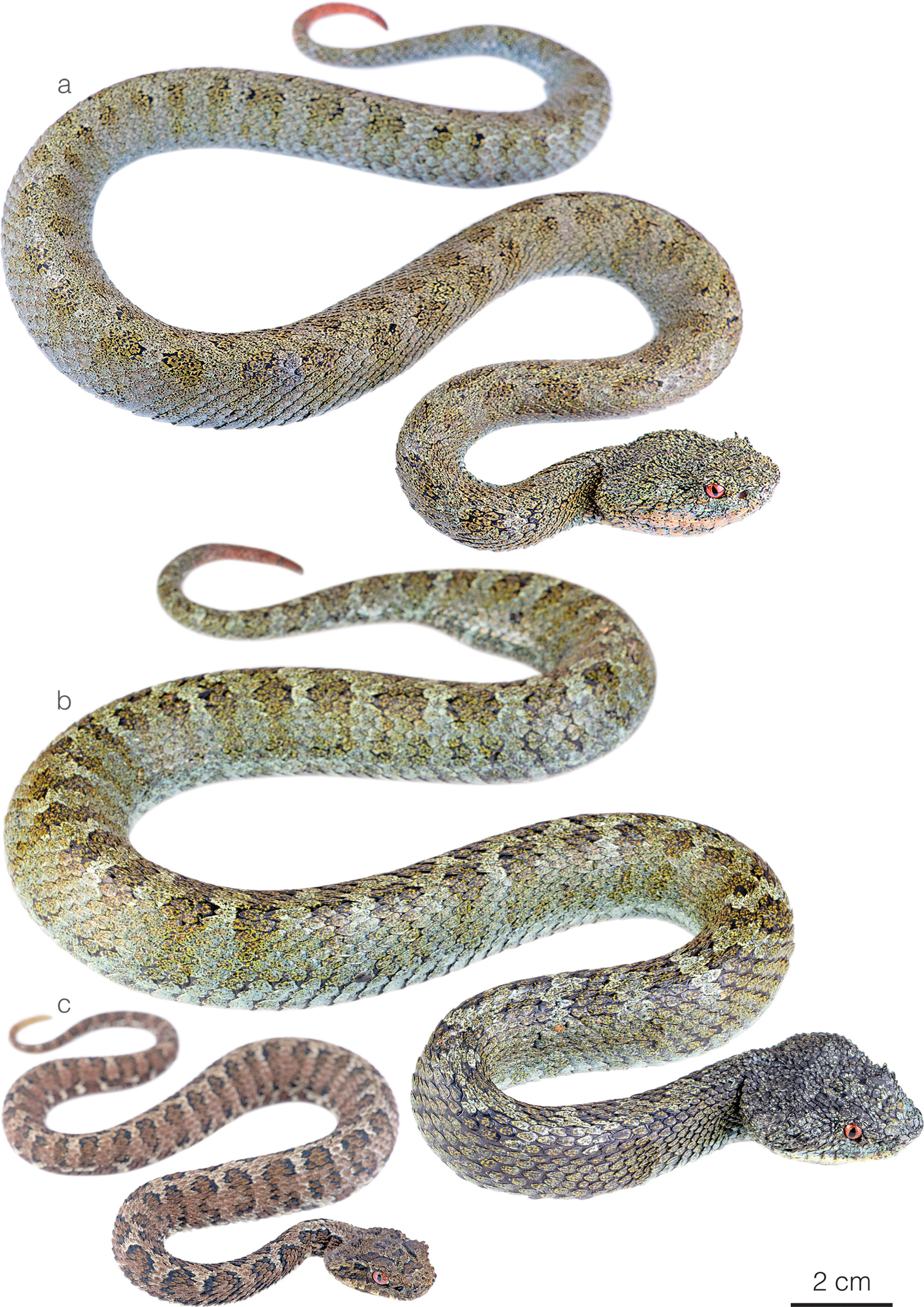
- Specimens from Colombia

Scientific classification
- Kingdom: Animalia
- Phylum: Chordata
- Class: Reptilia
- Order: Squamata
- Suborder: Serpentes
- Family: Viperidae
- Genus: Bothriechis
- Species: B. klebbai

Binomial name
- Bothriechis klebbai Arteaga et al. 2024

= Bothriechis klebbai =

Species of reptile

Bothriechis klebbai is a species of pit viper described in 2024.

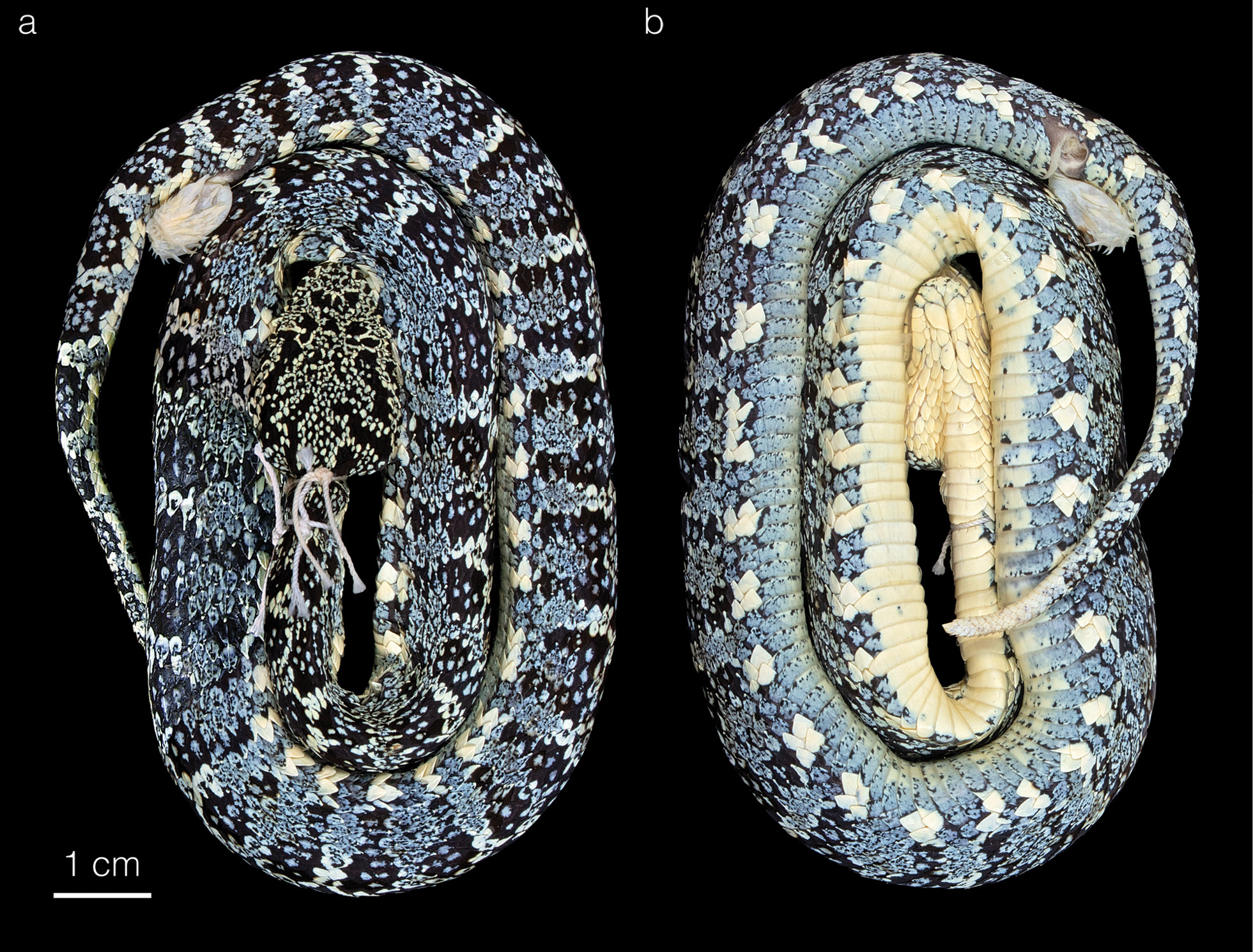
Holotype specimen (adult male)
