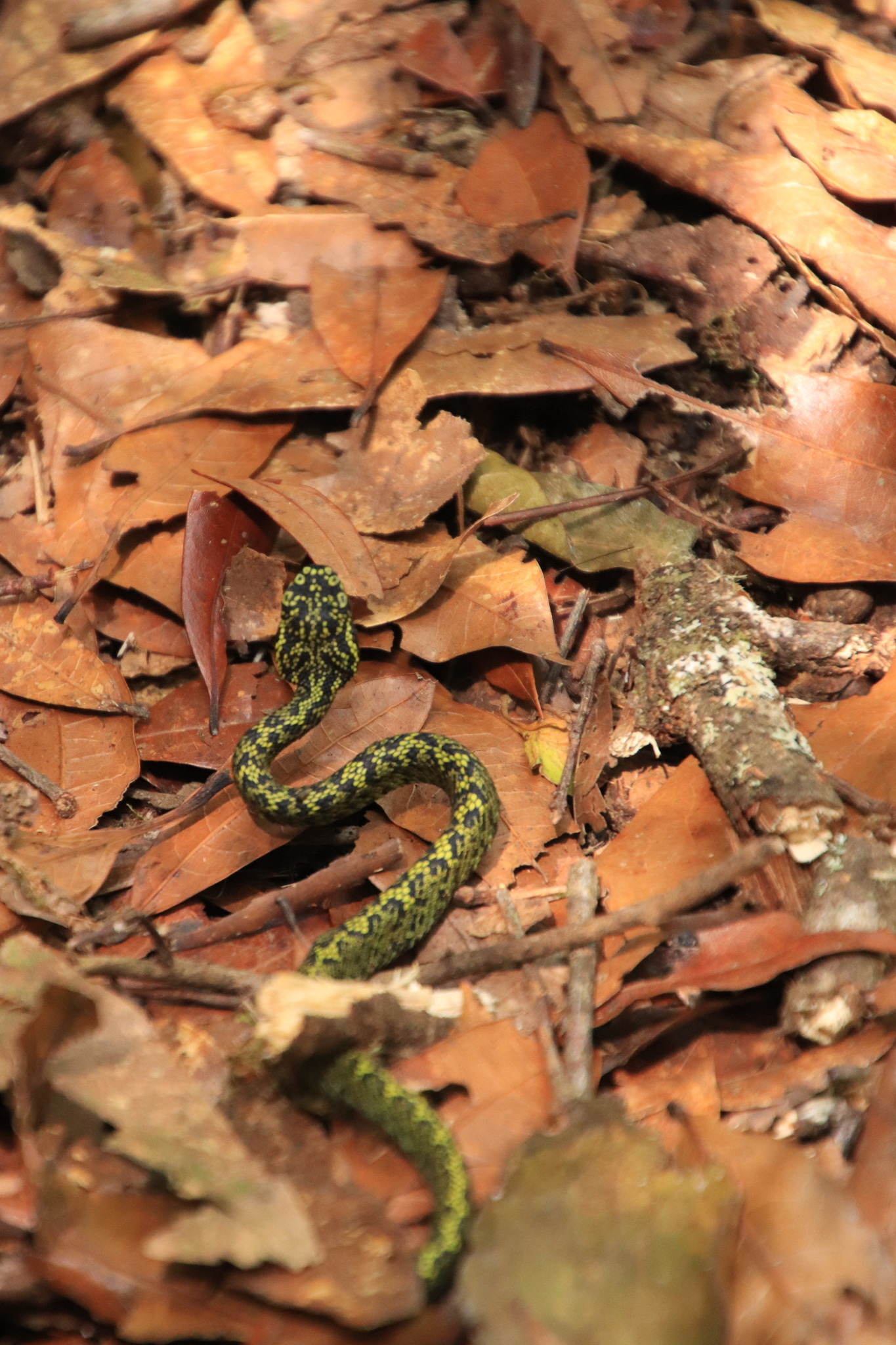

Scientific classification
- Kingdom: Animalia
- Phylum: Chordata
- Class: Reptilia
- Order: Squamata
- Suborder: Serpentes
- Family: Viperidae
- Genus: Bothriechis
- Species: B. nubestris

Binomial name
- Bothriechis nubestris Doan, Mason, Castoe, Sasa & Parkinson, 2016

= Bothriechis nubestris =

Species of snake

Bothriechis nubestris, the Talamancan palm-pitviper, is a species of pit viper native to cloud forests and montane rainforests in Costa Rica, specifically San José, Cartago and Limón. The snake was mistaken for Bothriechis nigroviridis.

== Description ==
The snake is a small-medium size, slender snake. It lives in trees and has a green-black coloration. The snake grows up to 30 inches, but many grow less than 24 inches. It is only discovered in Costa Rica. The snake kills with a toxin which is likely to be nigroviriditoxin. The toxin itself was discovered in 2015, and B. nubestris would be the first new-world viperid outside of rattle snakes to produce it.

The snake lacks supercillary scales, differing the species from both B. schlegelii and B. supraciliaris. B. nubestris also differs from most other Bothriechis species with its colouring - only similar in that respect to B. nigroviridis, which it differs to in its scale numbers and shapes (specifically, B. nubestris has thin 'kidney-shaped' supraoculars.)

== Discovery ==
The snake was first spotted by the University of Central Florida in 2001, but was mistaken for another species. It was discovered by DNA tests and named recently.

== Etymology ==
'nubestris' means 'belonging to the clouds' as it is a combination of the Latin noun nubes (meaning 'cloud') and the Latin suffix '-estris' (meaning 'belonging to'). This is in reference to the cloud forests it generally lives near.

== Reproduction ==
B. nubestris reproduce sexually and are ovoviviparous.
