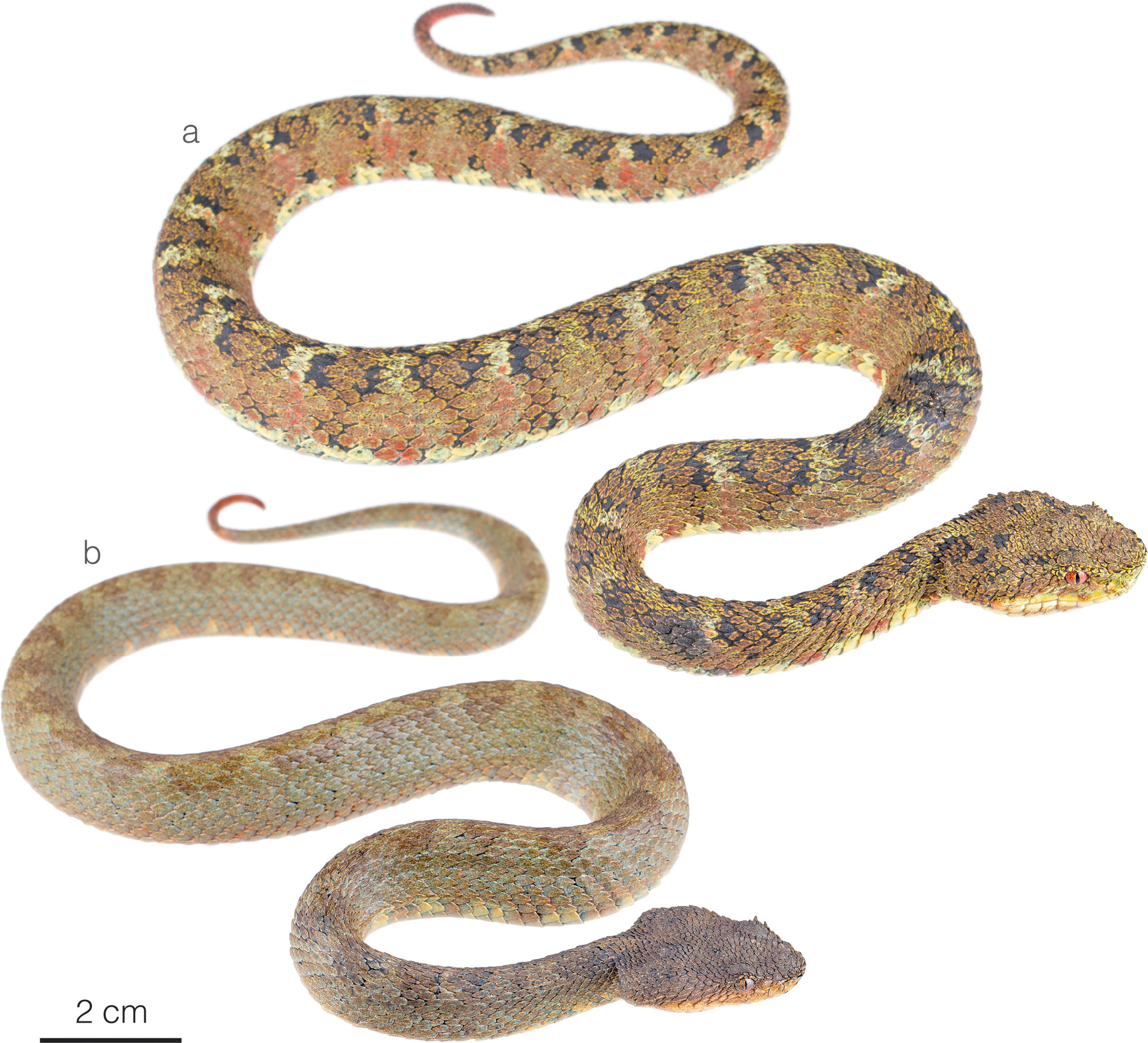
- Specimens from Colombia

Scientific classification
- Kingdom: Animalia
- Phylum: Chordata
- Class: Reptilia
- Order: Squamata
- Suborder: Serpentes
- Family: Viperidae
- Genus: Bothriechis
- Species: B. rasikusumorum

Binomial name
- Bothriechis rasikusumorum Arteaga et al. 2024

= Bothriechis rasikusumorum =

Species of reptile

Bothriechis rasikusumorum is a species of pit viper described in 2024. It is only known from the Río Magdalena watershed in Huila Department, Colombia, from the slopes of both Cordillera Central and Cordillera Oriental.

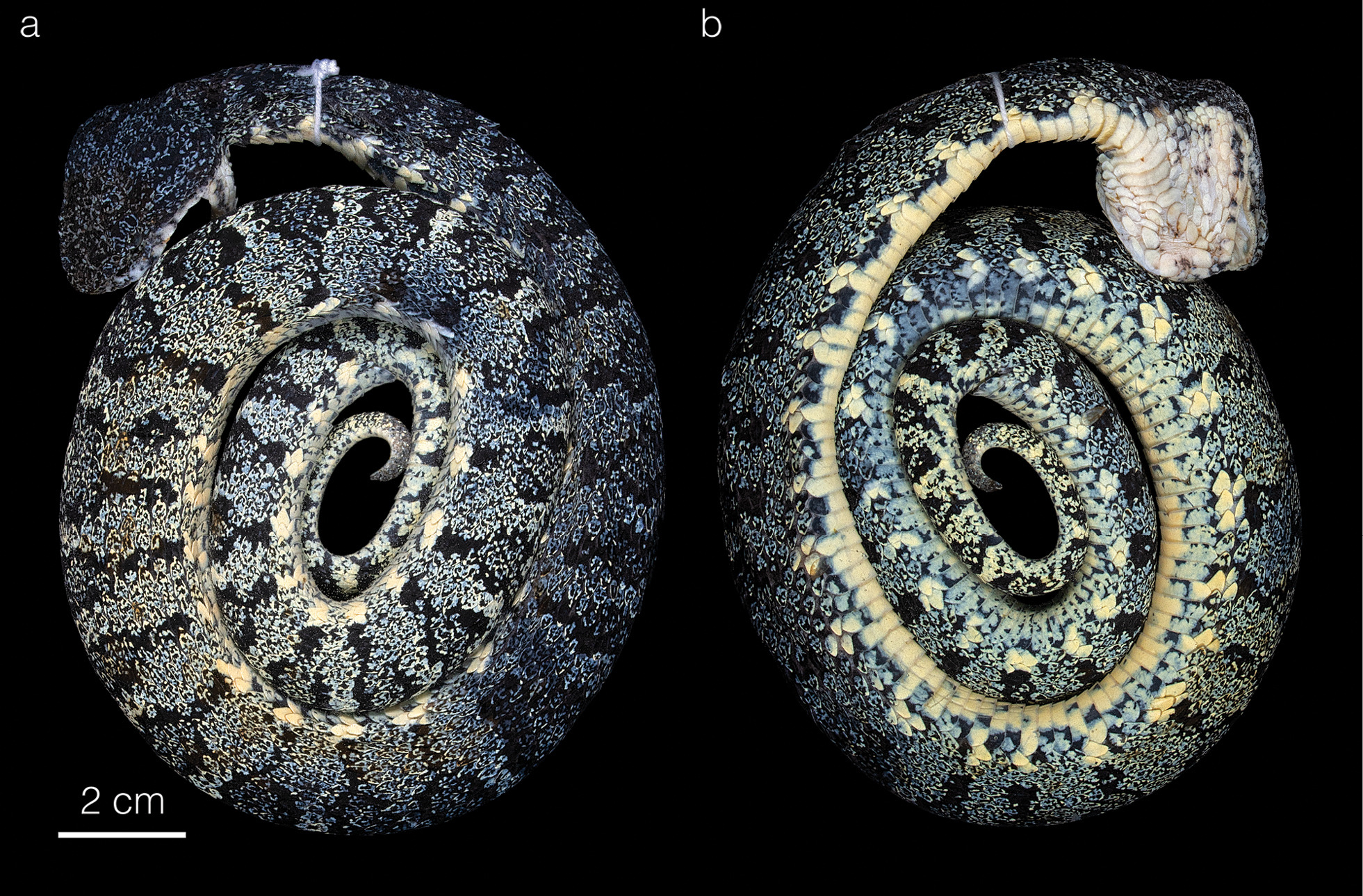
Holotype specimen (adult male)

Bothriechis rasikusumorum is an arboreal snake that can grow to a total length of 650 mm (26 in) in males and 799 mm (31.5 in) in females.
