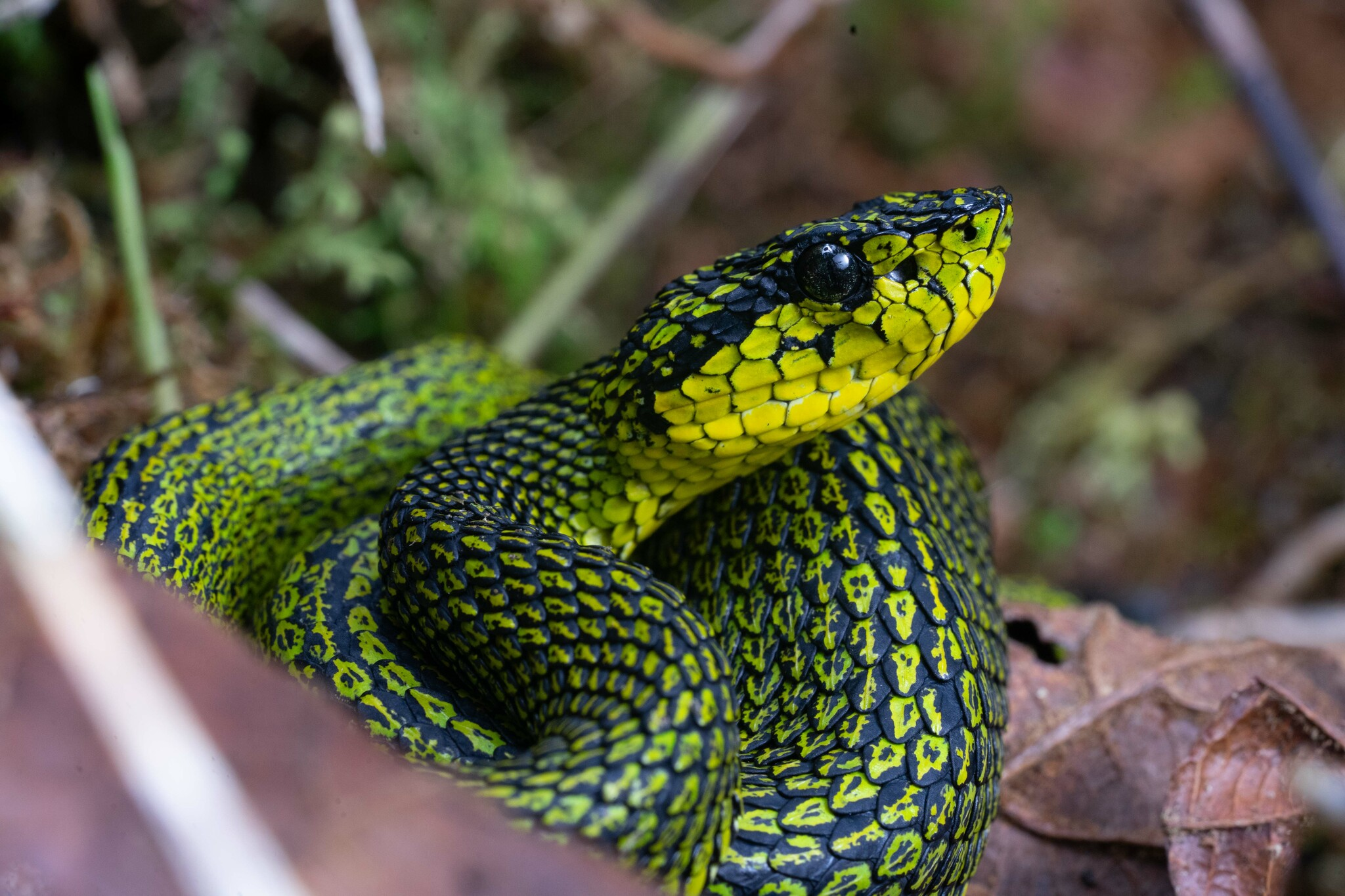
- Black-speckled palm-pitviper (Bothriechis nigroviridis)

Scientific classification
- Kingdom: Animalia
- Phylum: Chordata
- Class: Reptilia
- Order: Squamata
- Suborder: Serpentes
- Family: Viperidae
- Subfamily: Crotalinae
- Genus: Bothriechis; W. Peters, 1859

Species
- 19 species (see text)

Synonyms
- Bothriechis W. Peters, 1859; Teleuraspis Cope, 1860; Thamnocenchris Salvin, 1860; Thanatos Posada Arango, 1889; Thanatophis Posada Arango, 1889

= Bothriechis =

Genus of snakes

Bothriechis is a genus of pit vipers, commonly called palm vipers or palm-pit vipers found predominantly in Mexico and Central America. All members are relatively slender and arboreal. The name Bothriechis is derived from the Greek words bothros and echis that mean "pit" and "viper" respectively. Ten species and no subspecies are currently generally recognized.

== Description ==
Species that belong to the genus Bothriechis typically reach a total length (tail included) of 60–80 cm (24–31 in), while B. aurifer, B. bicolor and B. lateralis are known to grow to a total length of 1 m (39 in) or more.

General characteristics include a sharply defined canthus rostralis, an unelevated snout, a rostral scale that is not as high as it is broad, and a prehensile tail that accounts for at least 15% of the body length.

The color pattern usually consists of a green ground color that may or may not include pale or dark markings. B. schlegelii is an exception to this rule.

== Geographic range ==
Bothriechis species occur in southern Mexico (southeastern Oaxaca and the northern highlands of Chiapas), through Central America to northern South America (Colombia, western Venezuela, Ecuador and northern Peru).

== Behavior ==
As a general rule, species of Bothriechis found above 1,500 m (4,900 ft) altitude tend to be diurnal, while those found below 1,000 m (3,300 ft) tend to be active at night. Those found between 1,000 and 1,500 m (3,300 and 4,900 ft) may be active at any time of the day.

== Venom ==
Bothriechis venom is primarily a haemotoxin which causes severe pain, swelling, bleb formation, bruising, and quite often necrosis. If untreated it can lead to loss of a limb, or even death. Each year several farmers and plantation workers are bitten by eyelash vipers, sometimes resulting in fatalities. Wyeth in the United States and Instituto Clodomiro Picado in Costa Rica both manufacture different polyvalent antivenins which can be used to treat eyelash viper envenomations.

== Species ==
There are 19 recognized species.

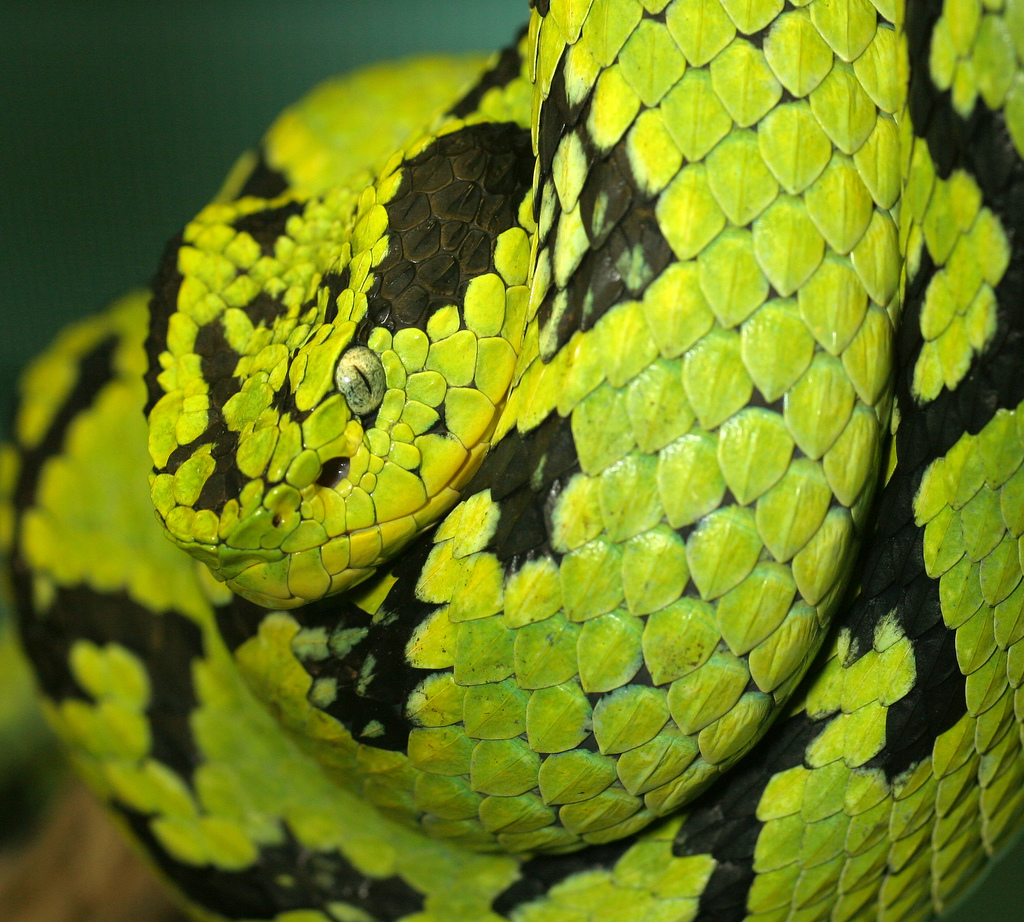
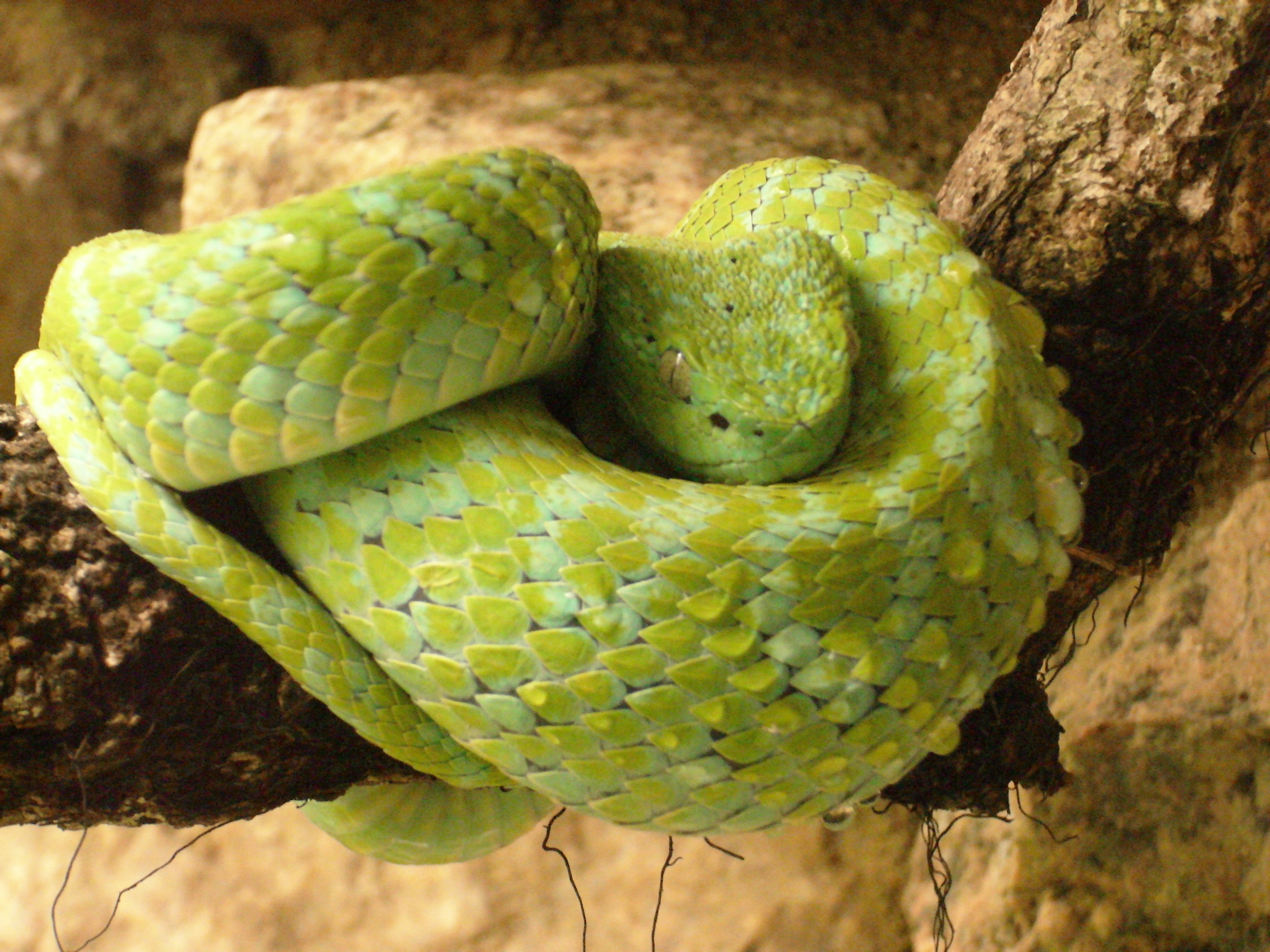
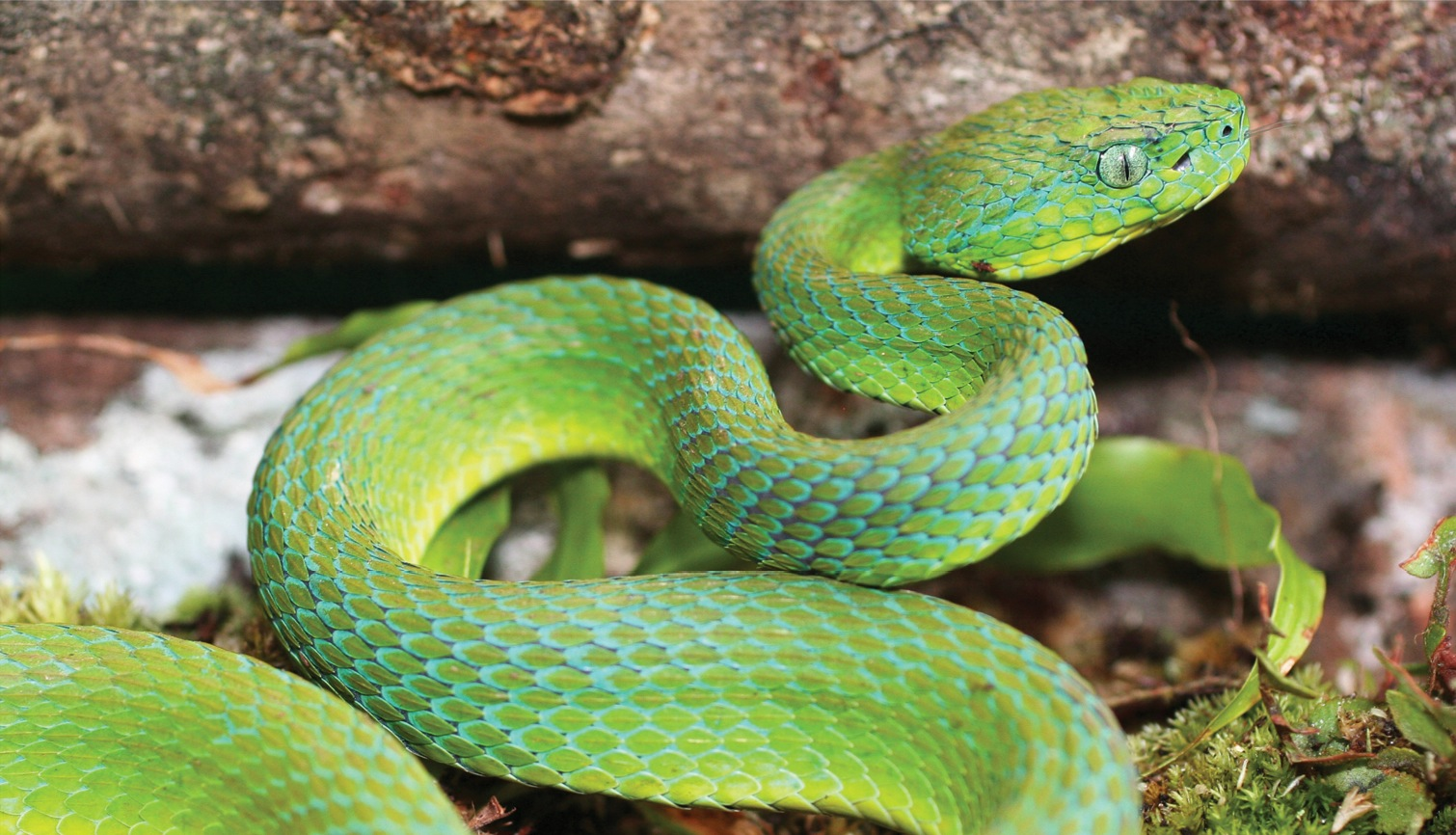
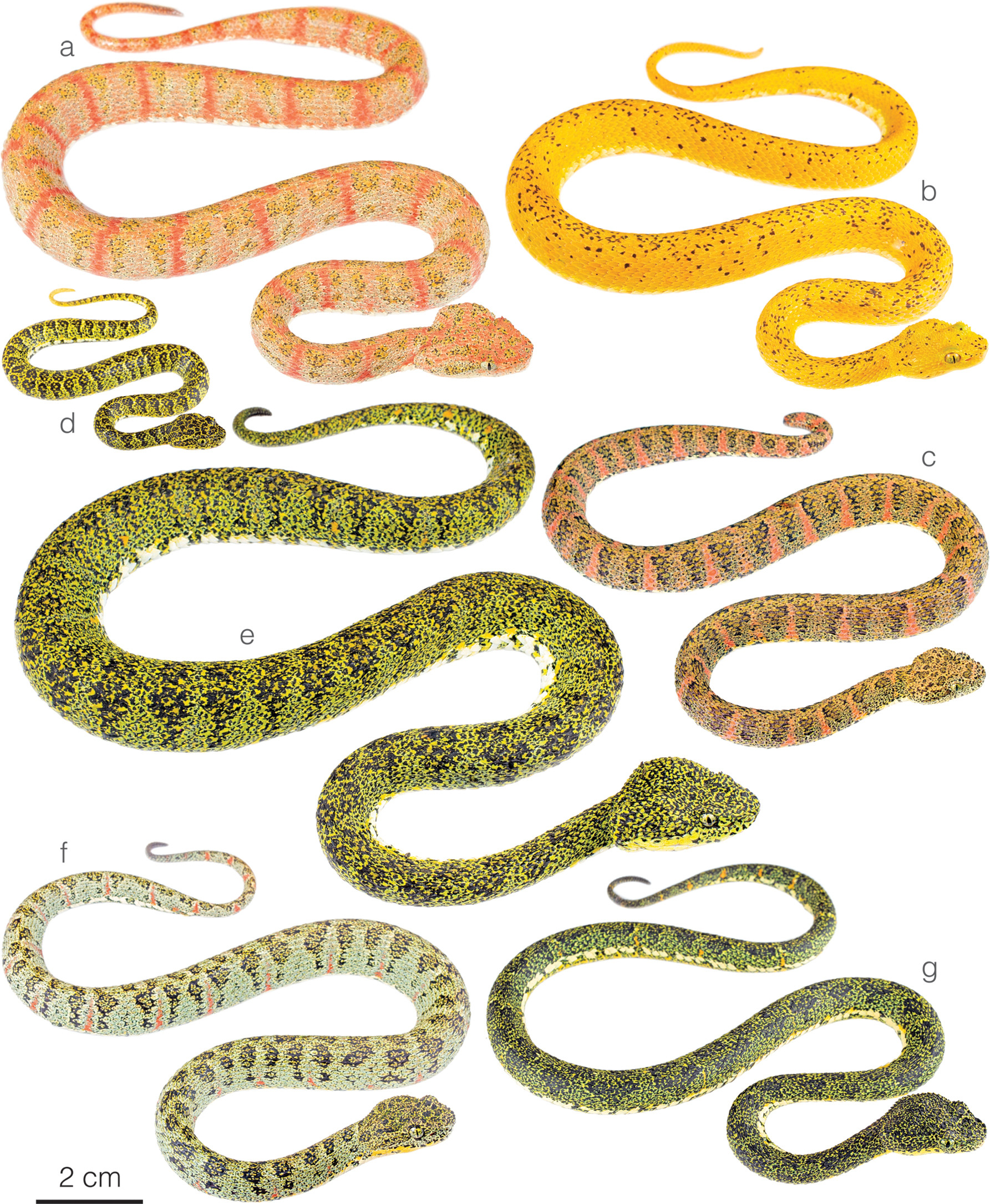
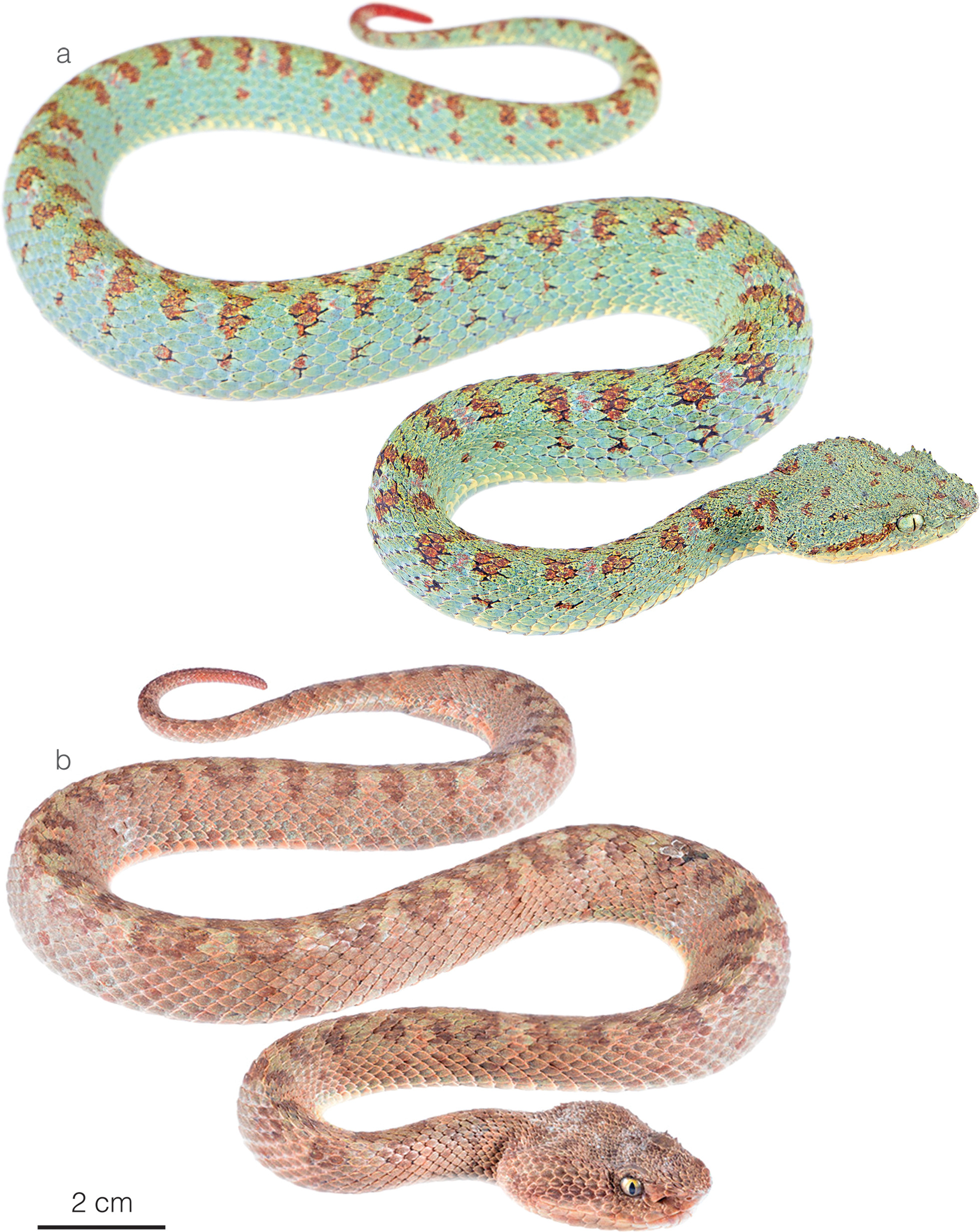
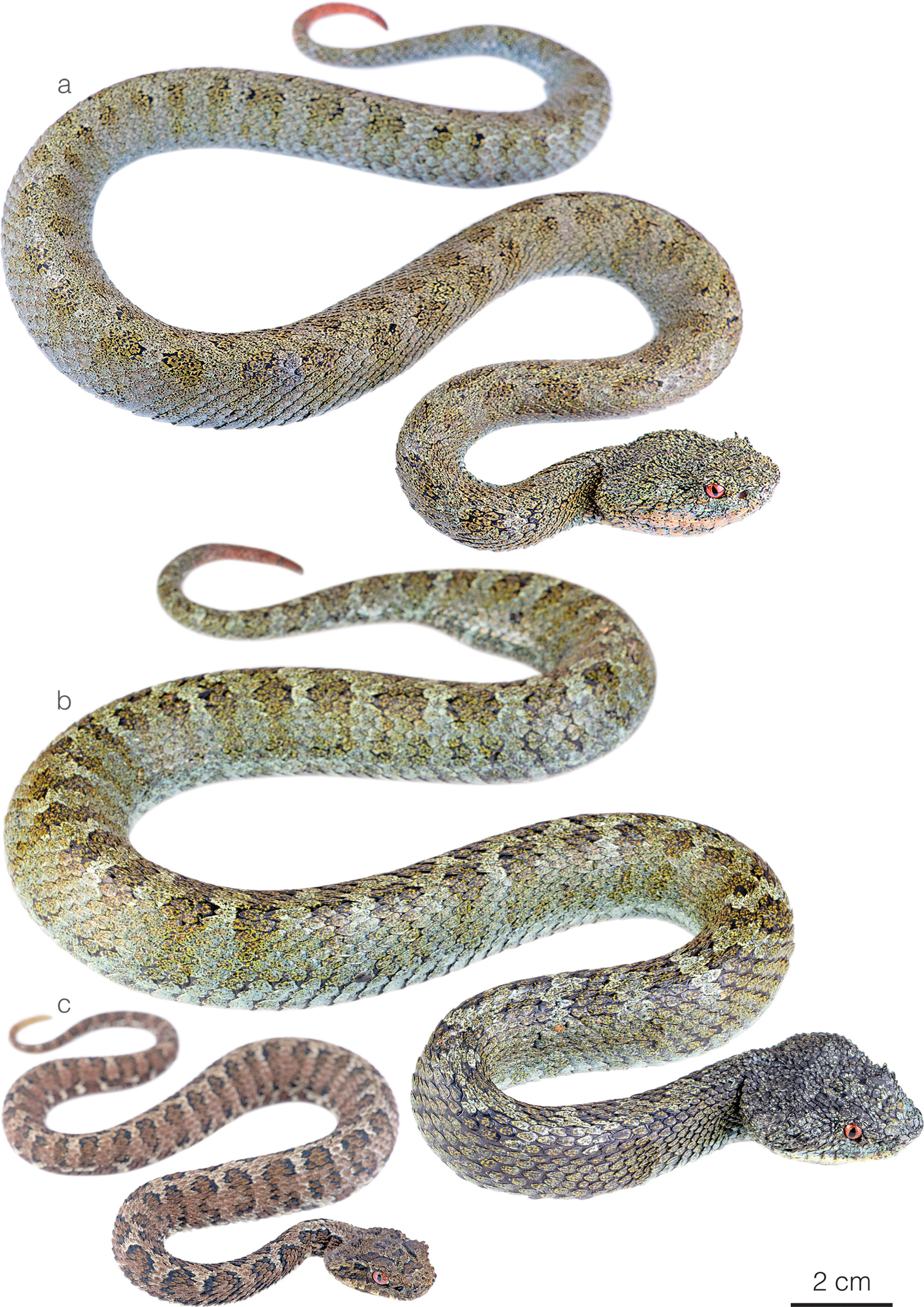
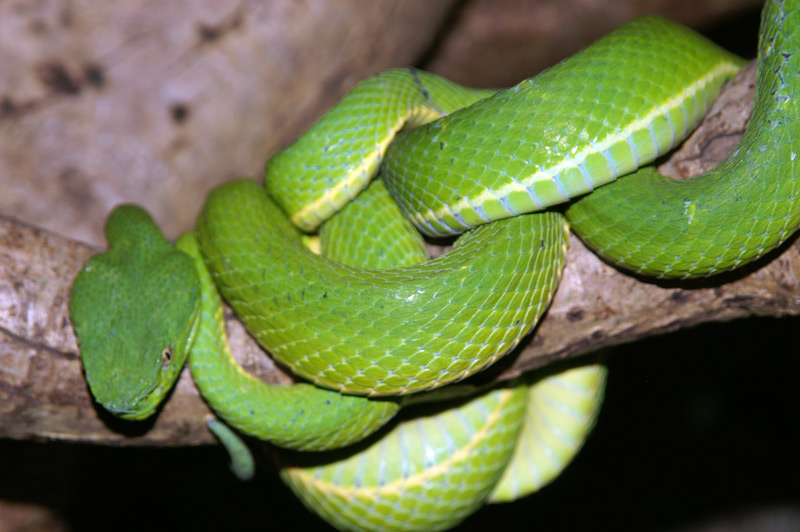
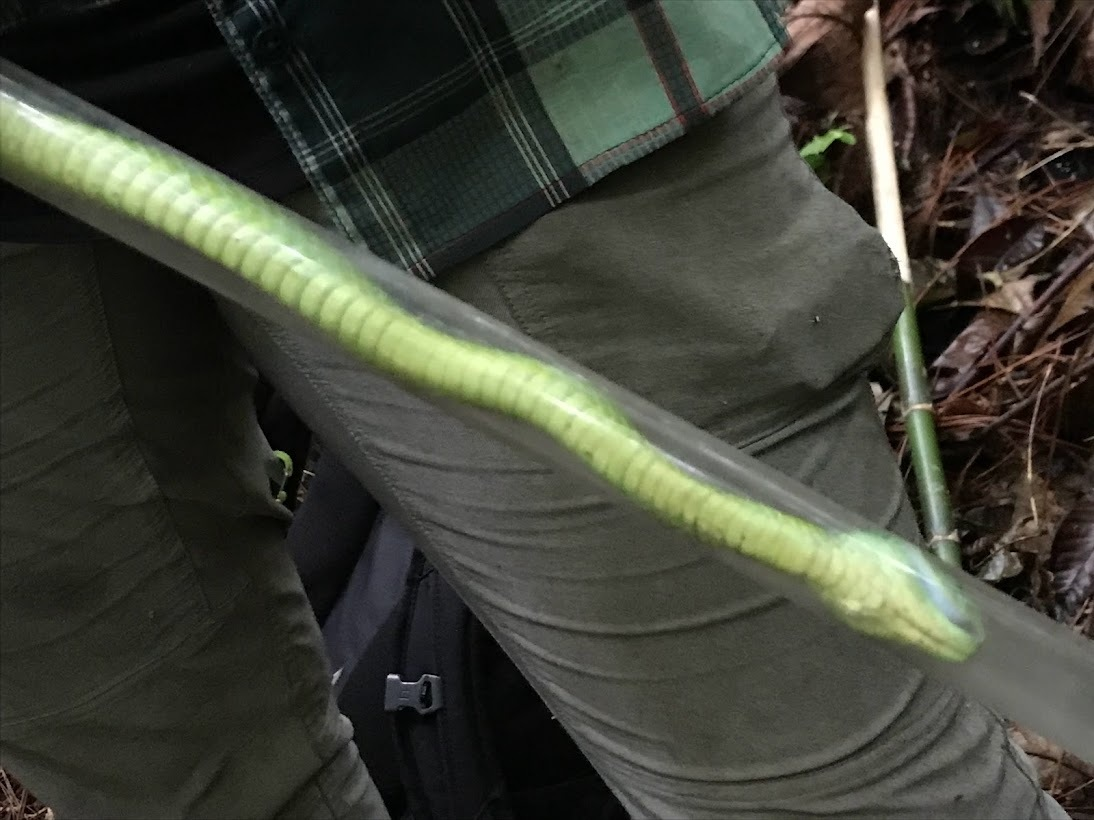
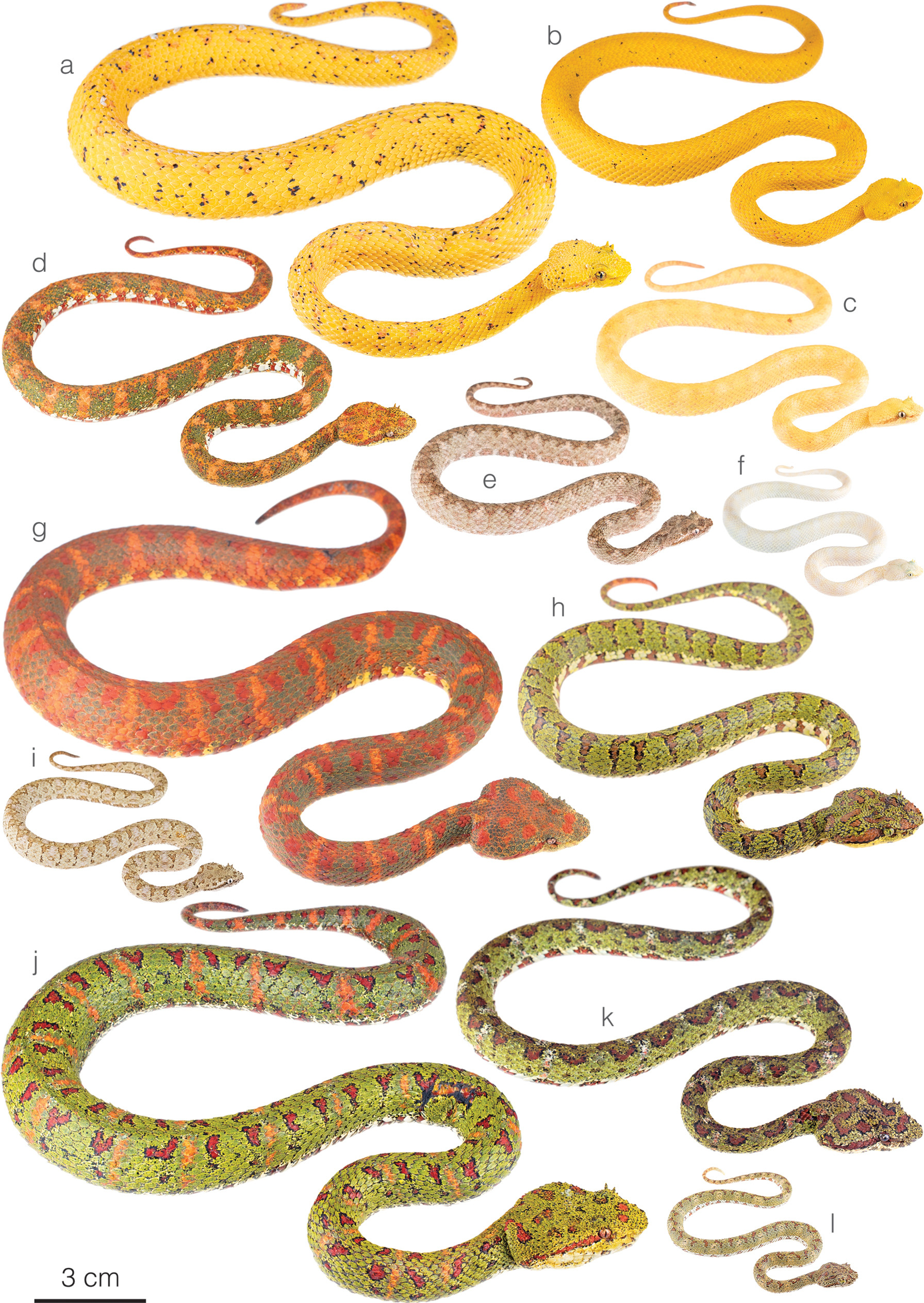
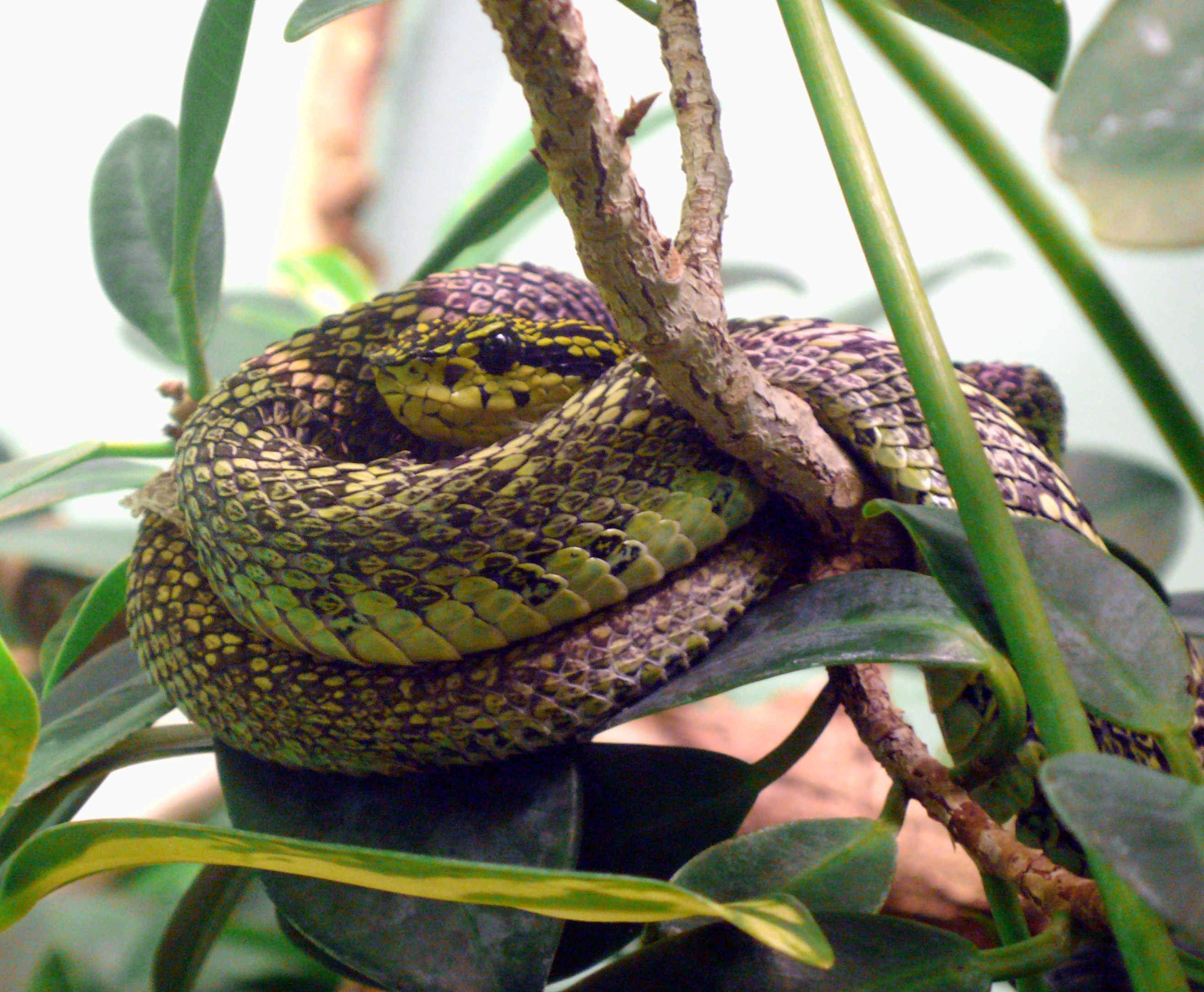
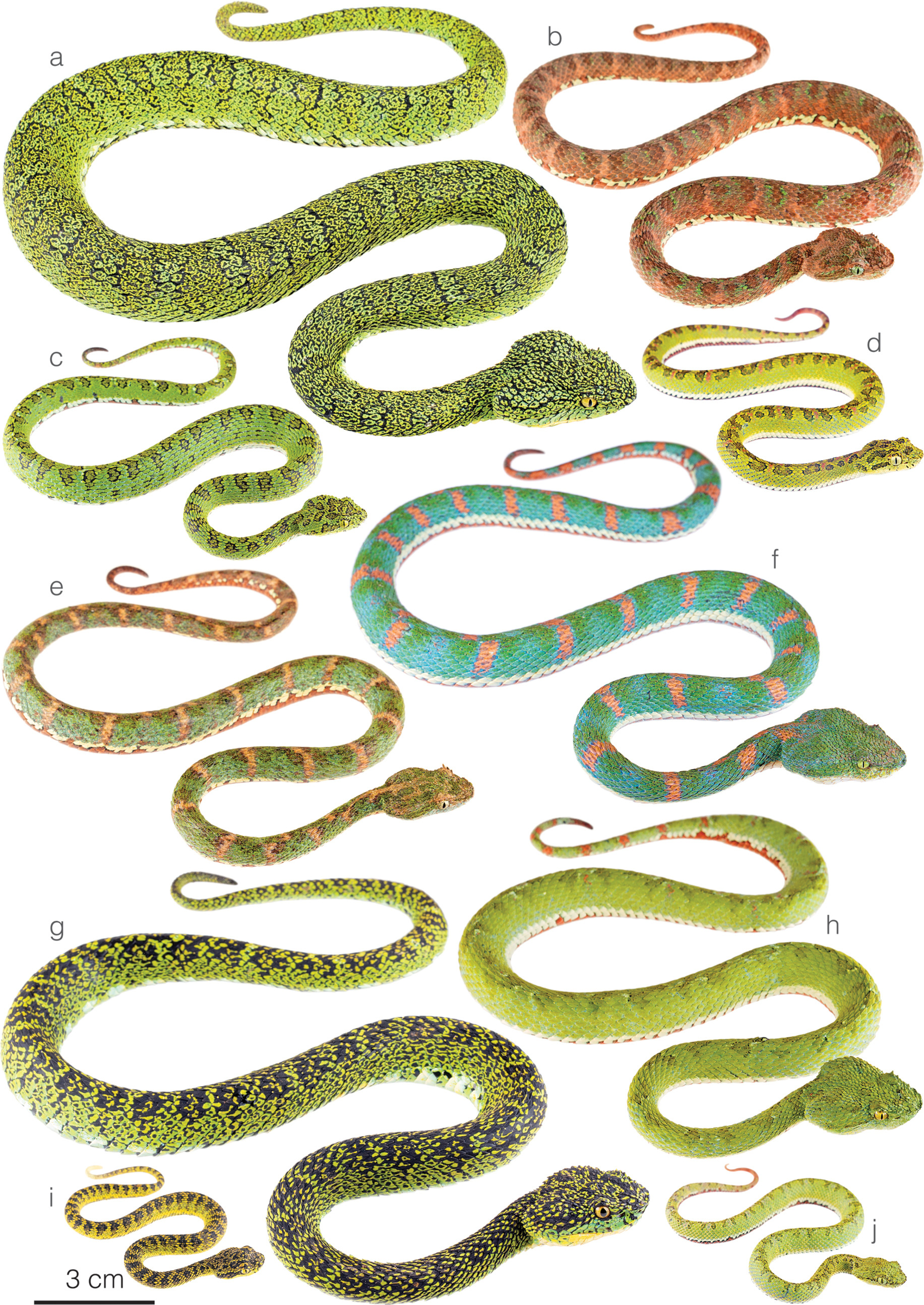
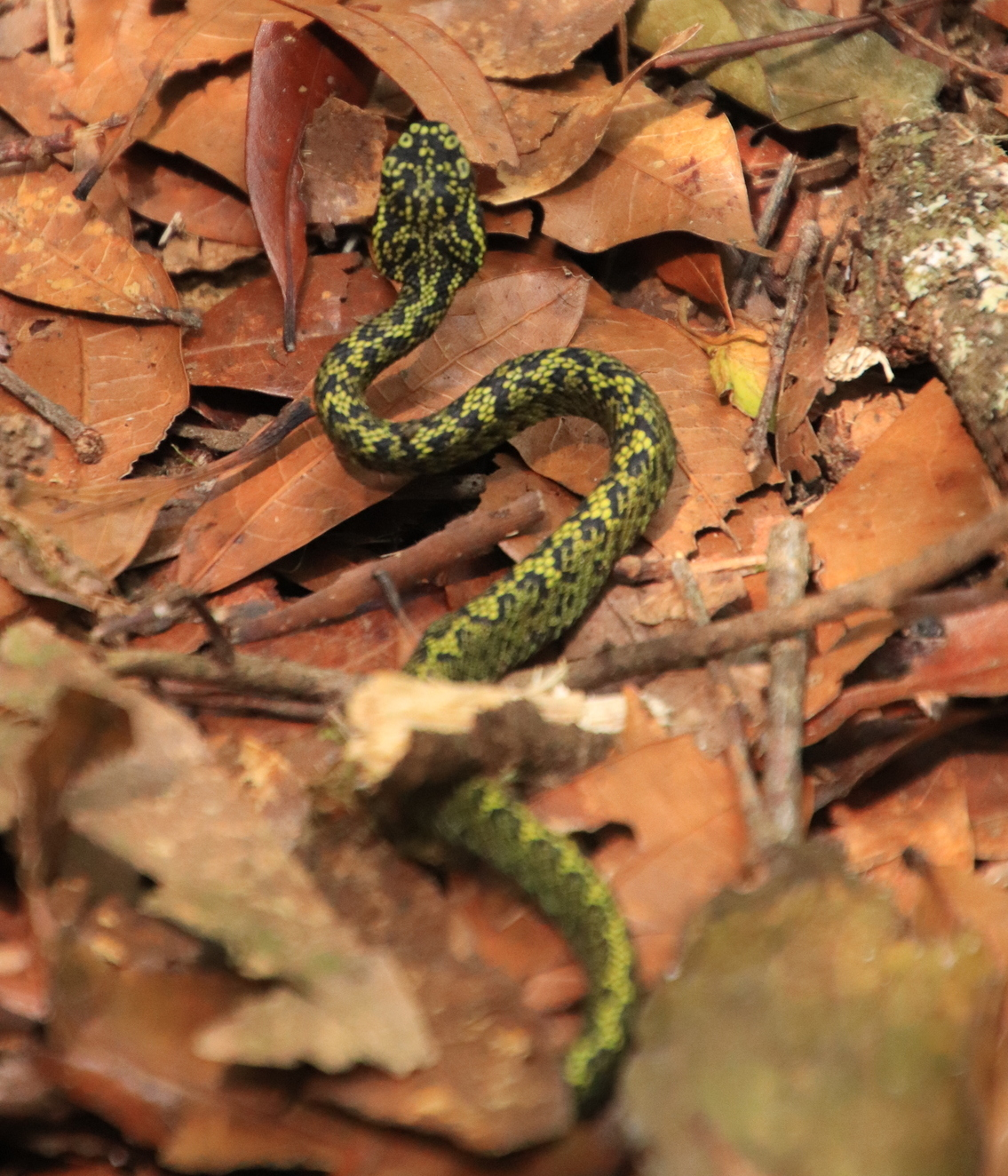
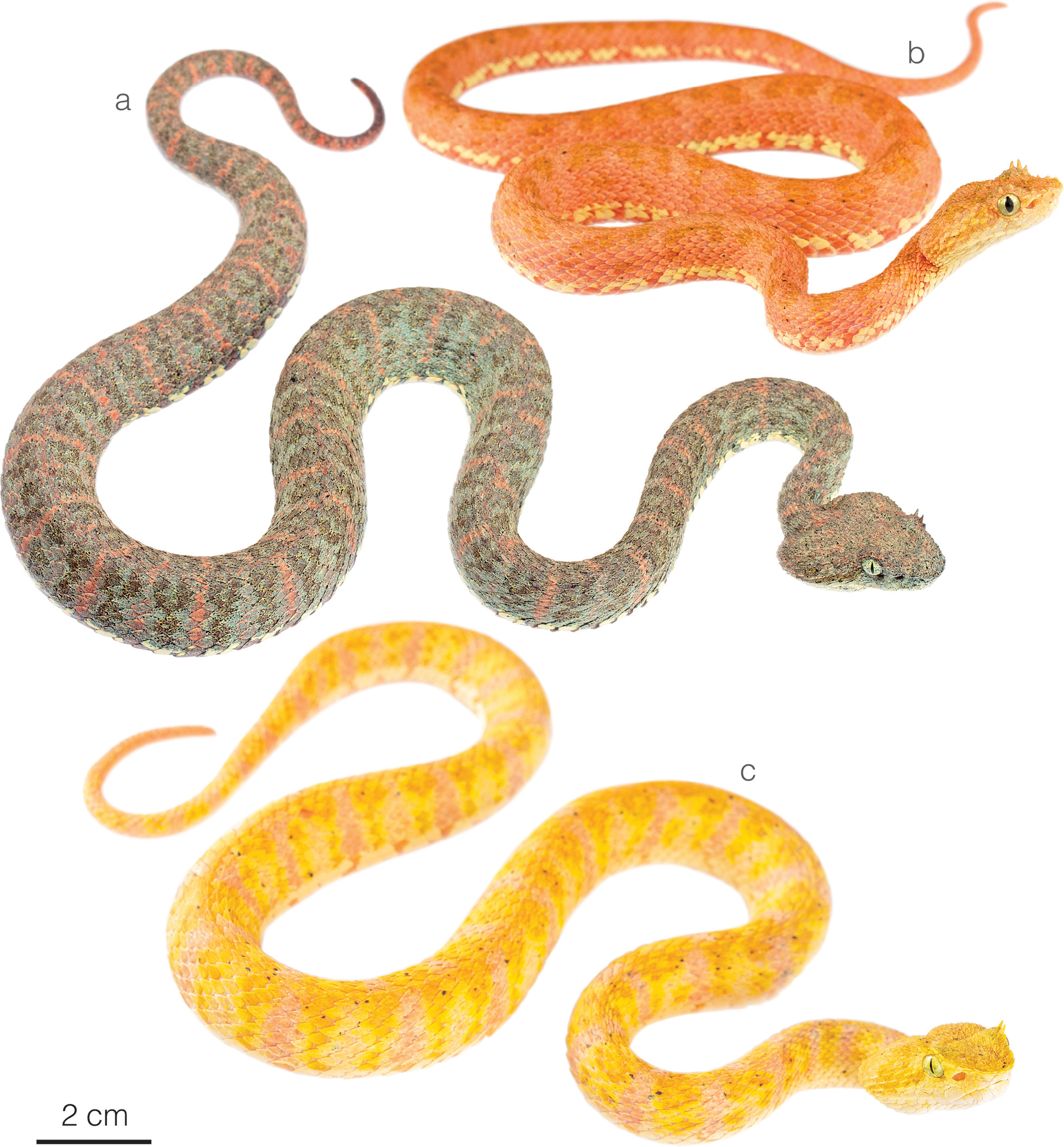
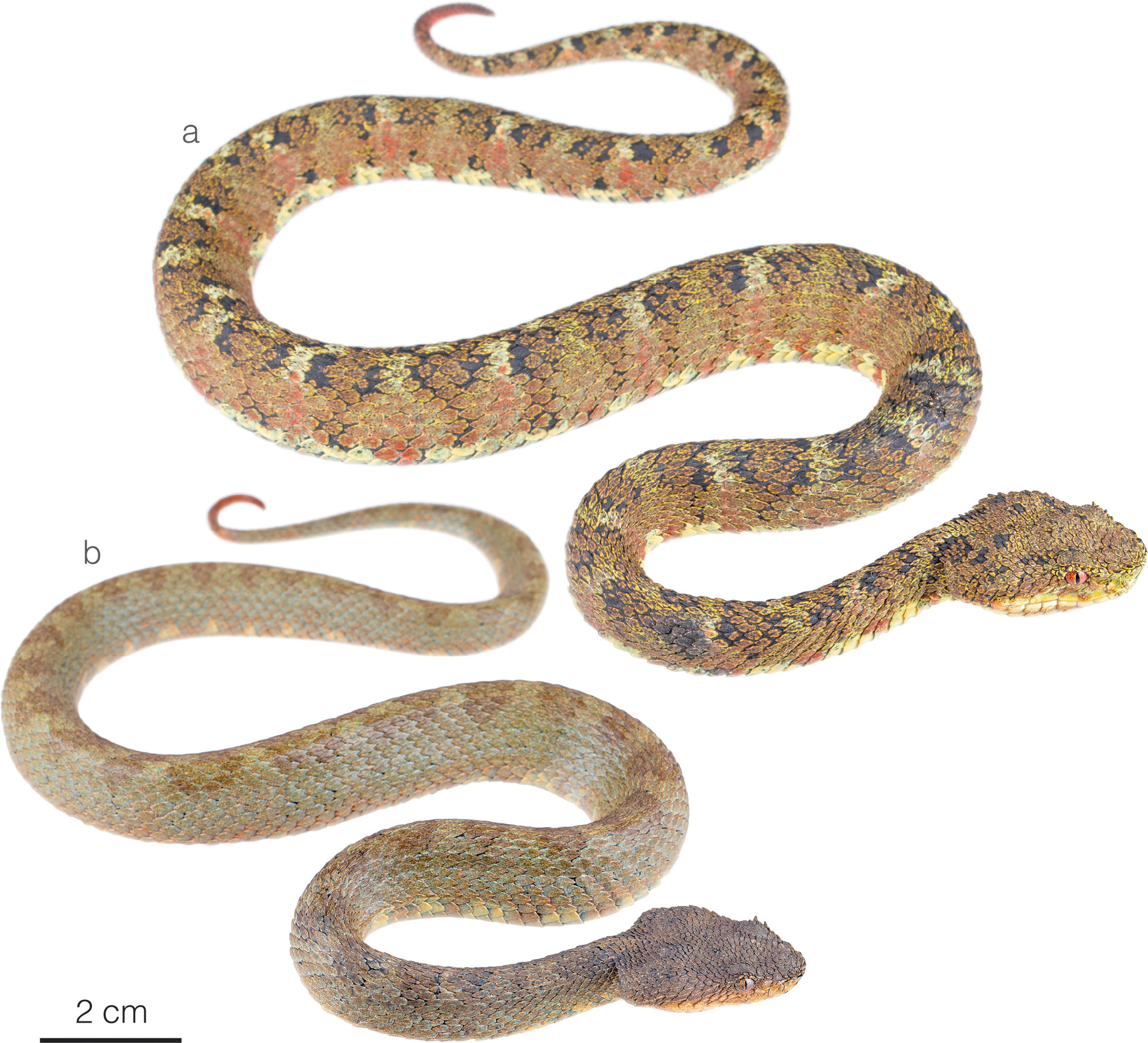
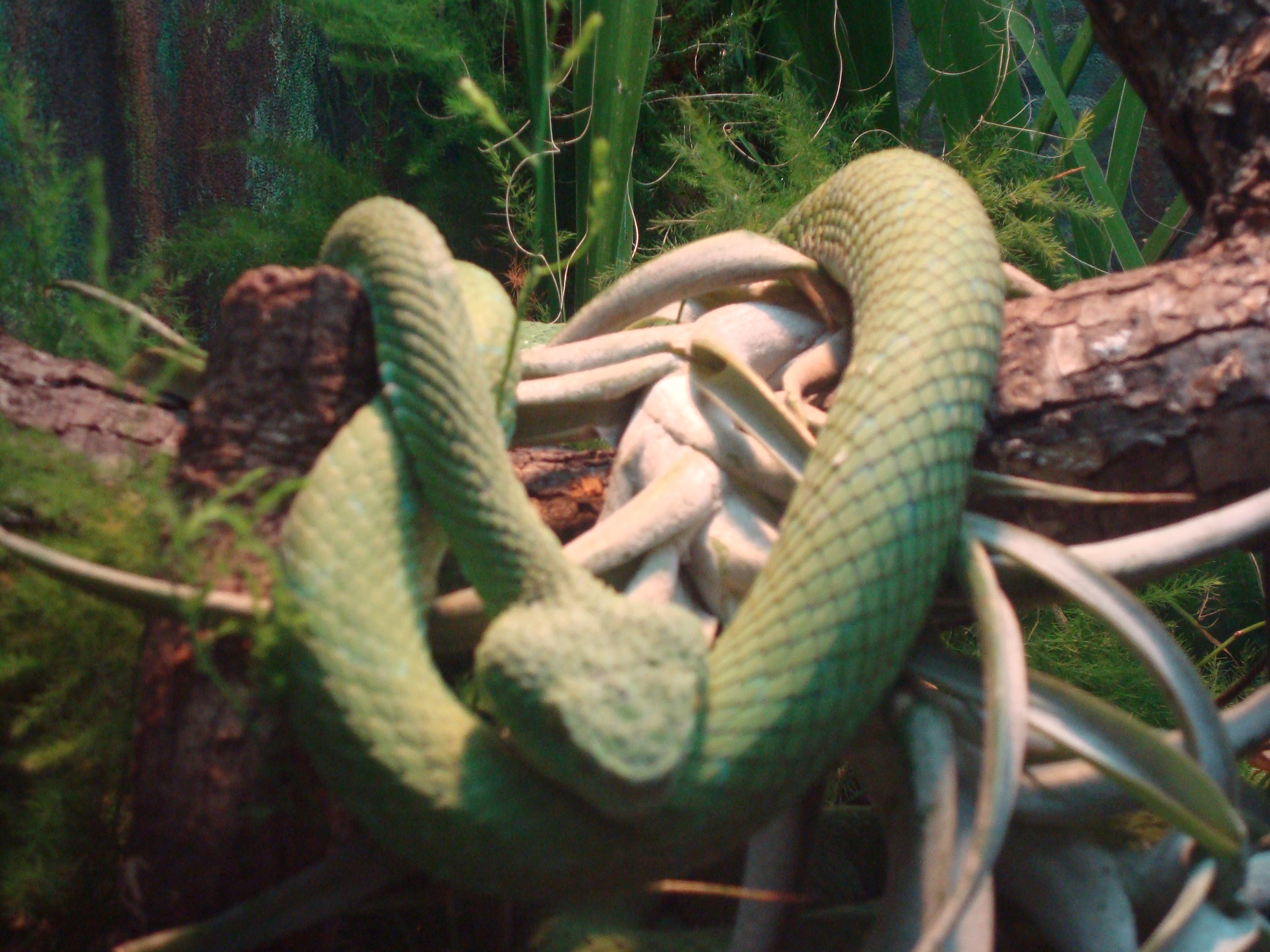
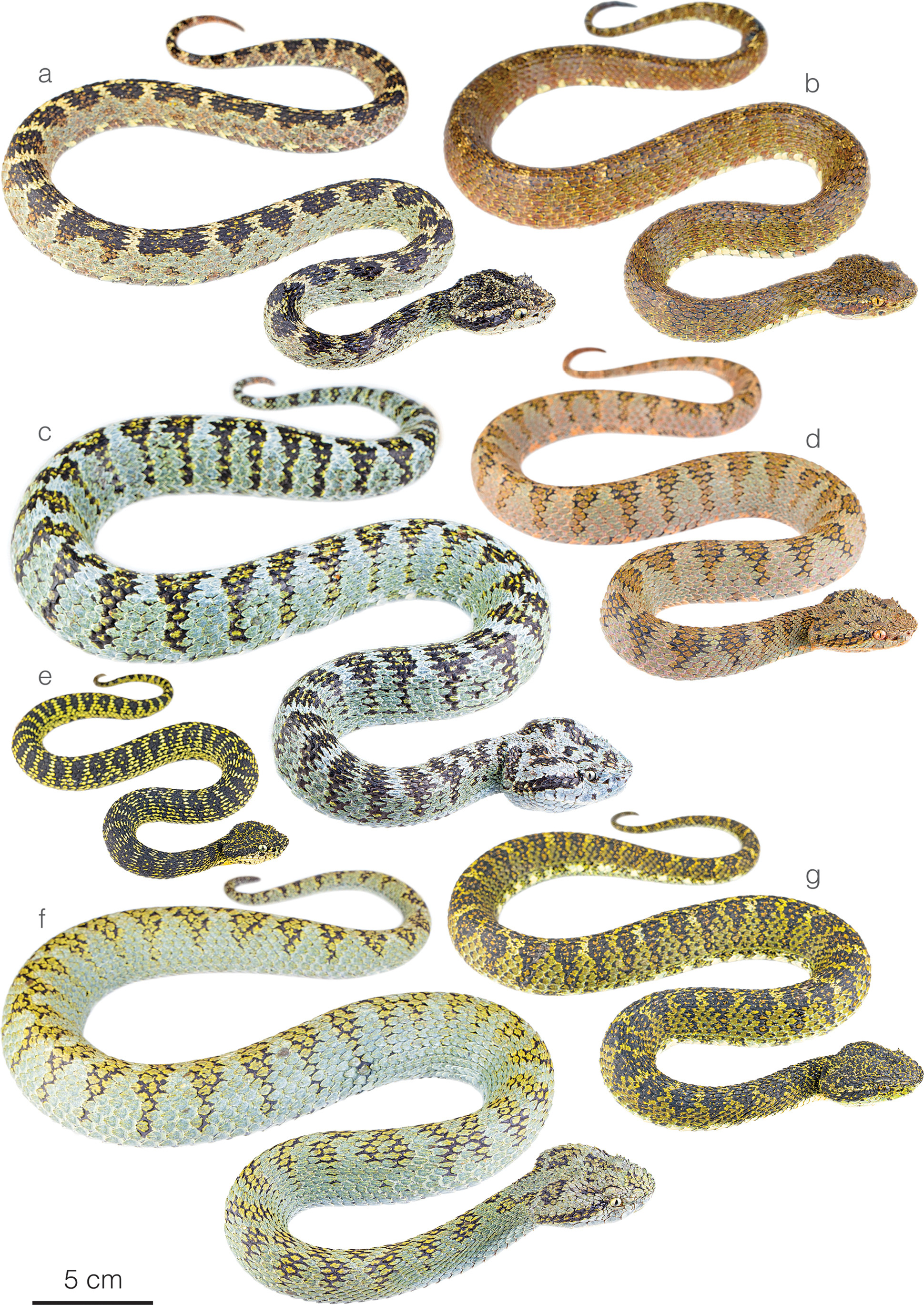
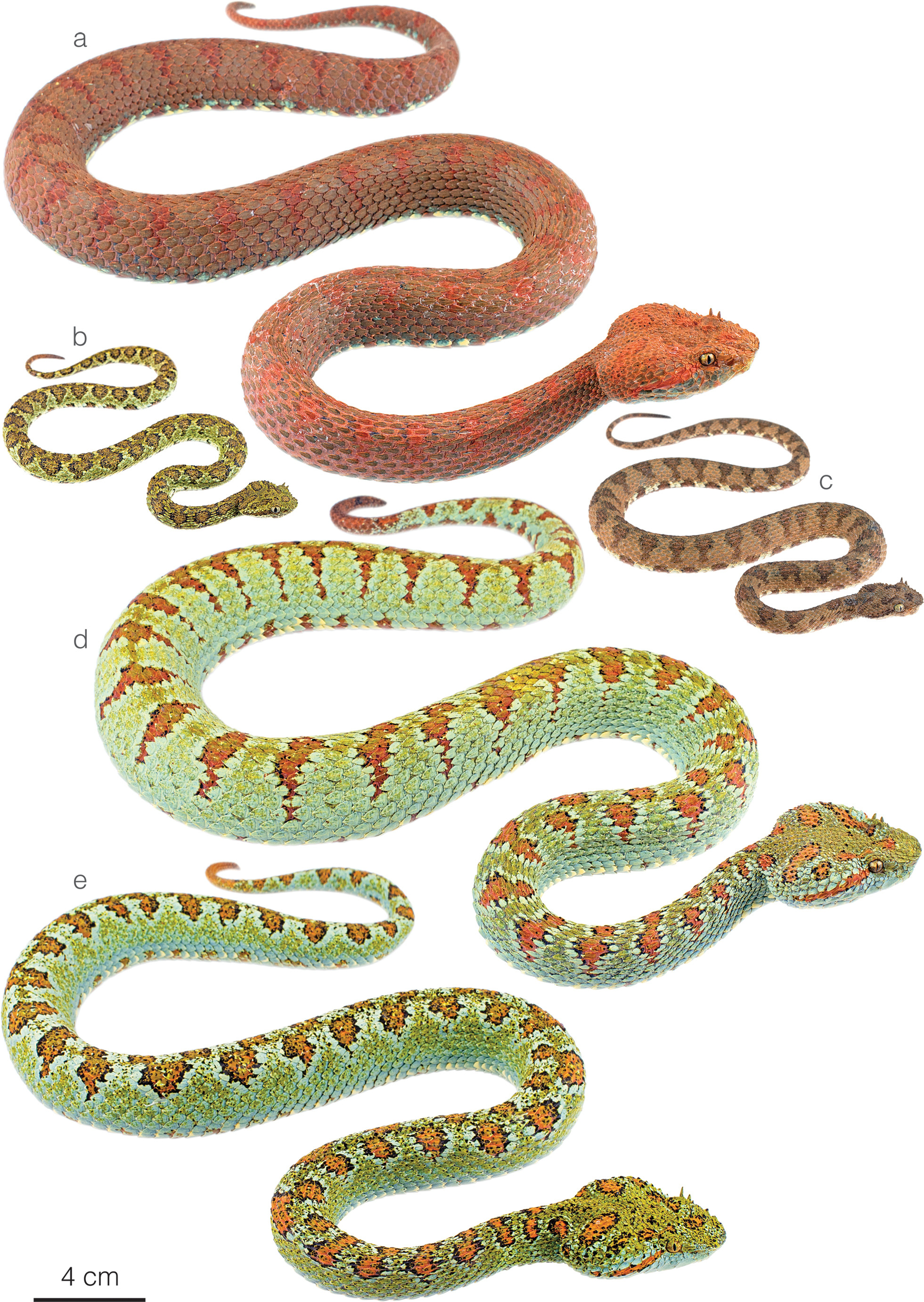
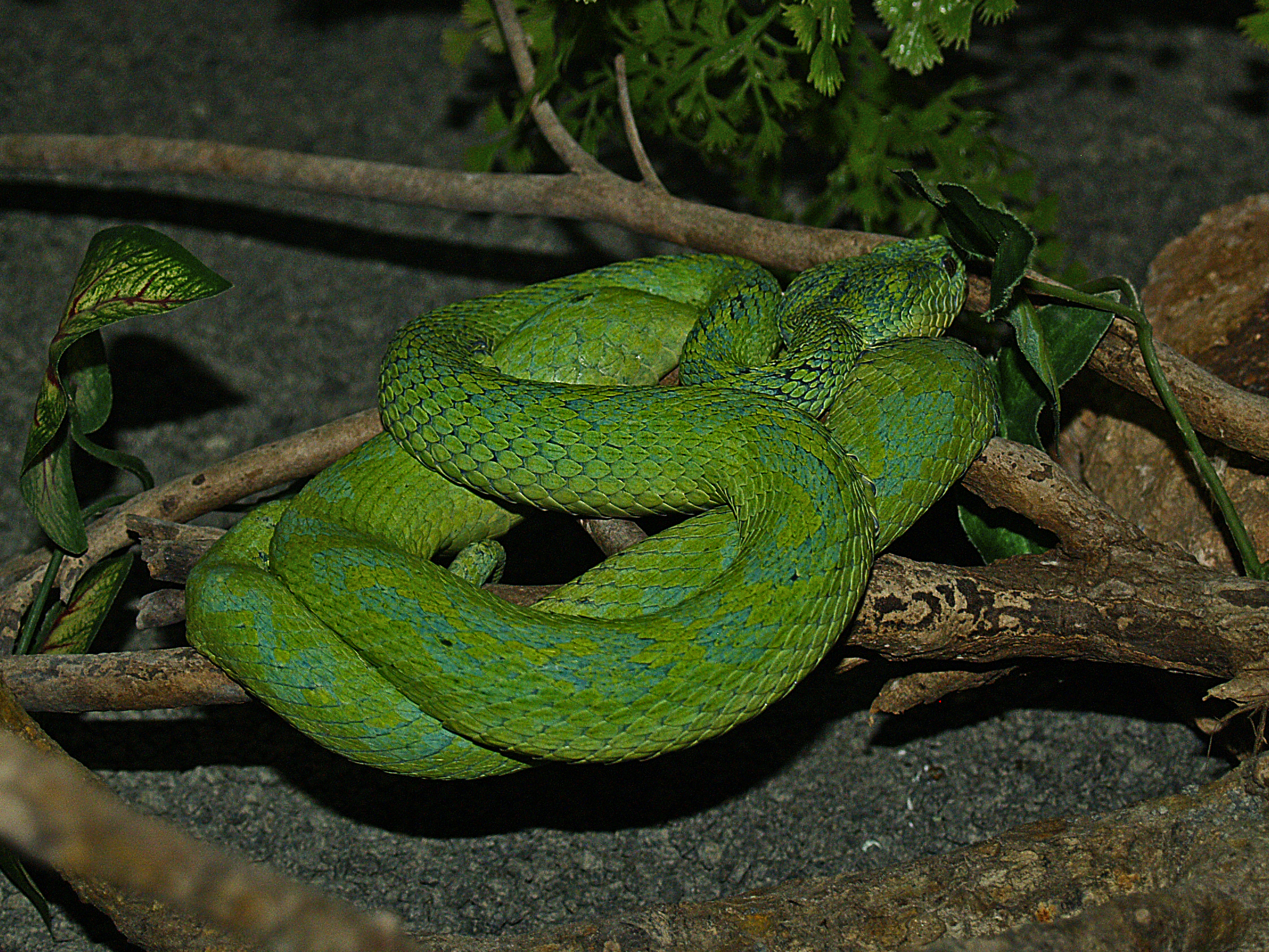
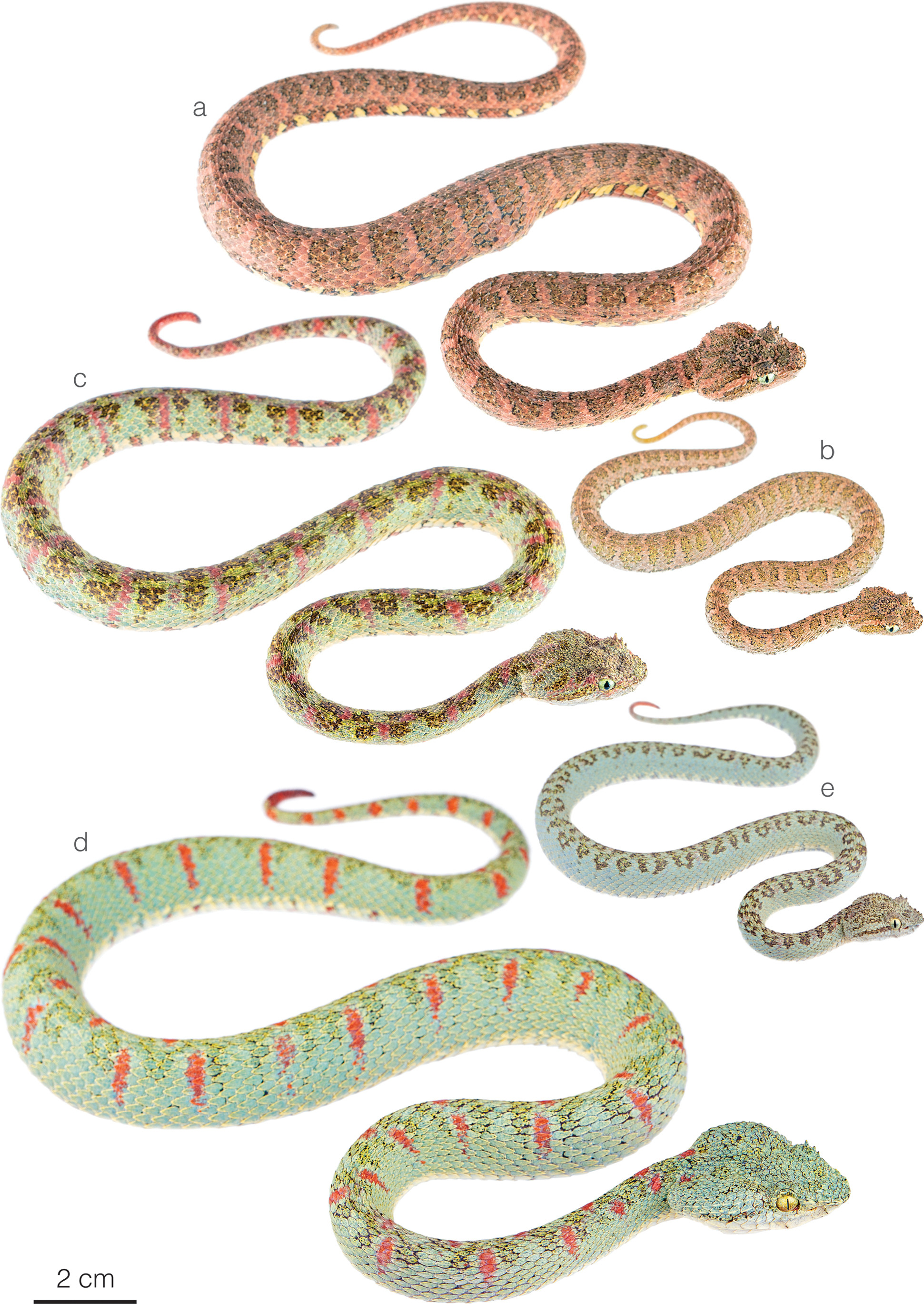
Image	Species	Taxon author	Common name	Geographic range
	B. aurifer	(Salvin, 1860)	yellow-blotched palm-pitviper	Mexico, in the mountains of eastern Chiapas, in northern Guatemala. Occurs in cloud forest at 1200–2300 m altitude.
	B. bicolor	(Boucourt, 1868)	Guatemalan palm-pitviper	The Pacific slope of southeastern Chiapas in Mexico, eastward to south-central Guatemala. Also known from several locations in Honduras, including the southern part of the Sierra del Merendón and Cerro Santa Bárbara. Occurs in cloud forests at 500–2000 m altitude.
	B. guifarroi	Townsend, Medina-Flores, Wilson, Jadin & Austin, 2013	Guifarro's palm-pitviper	Honduras at 1015–1450 m altitude. "Found in the western portion of Cordillera Nombre de Dios, Department of Atlantida, Honduras."
	B. hussaini	Arteaga et al. 2024	Hussain's eyelash pitviper
	B. khwargi	Arteaga et al. 2024	Khwarg’s eyelash pitviper
	B. klebbai	Arteaga et al. 2024	Klebba's eyelash pitviper
	B. lateralis	W. Peters, 1862	side-striped palm-pitviper	The mountains of Costa Rica and western Panama, including the Cordillera de Tilarán, the Cordillera Central and the Cordillera de Talamanca to the provinces of Chiriquí Province and Veraguas. Occurs at 850–980 m altitude.
	B. marchi	(Barbour & Loveridge, 1929)	Honduran palm-pitviper	The Atlantic versant of northwestern Honduras and eastern Guatemala. Occurs in mesic forest at elevations of 500–1500 m altitude.
	B. nigroadspersus	Steindachner, 1870	Central American eyelash pitviper	From southern Mexico (northern Chiapas), southeastward on the Atlantic slope and lowlands through Central America. Also found on the Pacific versant and lowlands in parts of Costa Rica and Panama. Occurs in mesic forest at elevations almost from sea level to 1434m altitude.
	B. nigroviridis^{T}	W. Peters, 1859	black-speckled palm-pitviper	The mountains of Costa Rica and Panama. Also found in the cloud forests of the Cordillera Central and the Cordillera de Talamanca at 1150–2400 m altitude.
	B. nitidus	Günther, 1859	Ecuadorian eyelash pitviper
	B. nubestris	Doan, Mason, Castoe, Sasa & Parkinson, 2016	Talamancan palm-pitviper	Costa Rica. San Isidro de El General, Province of San José at approximately 3000 m altitude.
	B. rahimi	Arteaga et al. 2024	Rahim's eyelash pitviper
	B. rasikusumorum	Arteaga et al. 2024	Shah's eyelash pitviper
	B. rowleyi	(Bogert, 1968)	Mexican palm-pitviper	Mexico in southeastern Oaxaca and northern Chiapas. Occurs in cloud forests at 1500–1830 m altitude.
	B. schlegelii	(Berthold, 1846)	highland eyelash pitviper, Schlegel’s eyelash pitviper	Colombia, primarily in highland regions
	B. supraciliaris	(Taylor, 1954)	blotched eyelash pitviper	Only found in a mountainous area in southwestern Costa Rica. Occurs in lower montane wet forest and cloud forest at elevations from 800 m to 1,700 m.
	B. thalassinus	Campbell & E.N. Smith, 2000	Merendon palm-pitviper	Guatemala, Honduras at 1370–1750 m altitude.
	B. torvus	Posada-Arango, 1889	Birri eyelash pitviper

^{T} type species

== Taxonomy ==
A new species of Bothriechis from Guatemala and Honduras, B. thalassinus, was described by Campbell & E.N. Smith (2000). Campbell & Lamar (2004) recognize this species, as well as a ninth addition to the genus: B. supraciliaris, which was first described by Taylor (1954) as a subspecies of B. schlegelii, and is found in southwestern Costa Rica.

In 2024, a systematic revision of B. schlegelii through DNA-sequencing split it into an additional number of species: B. klebbai, B. rasikusumorum, B. khwargi, B. rahimi, and B. hussaini. At the same time names that were previously synonyms were revalidated: B. nigroadspersus (Steindachner, 1870), B. nitidus (Günther, 1859), and B. torvus (Posada Arango, 1889a). Due to the close relation between these species alongside B. supraciliaris, they are considered to be part of a B. schlegelii species complex, otherwise referred to as the "eyelash clade" within Bothriechis. These "eyelash vipers" form a monophyletic clade that is sister to the rest of the genus.

B. guifarroi was discovered in 2010 and described by Townsend et al. in 2013, in a study that included the following suggested phylogenetic tree of the genus:

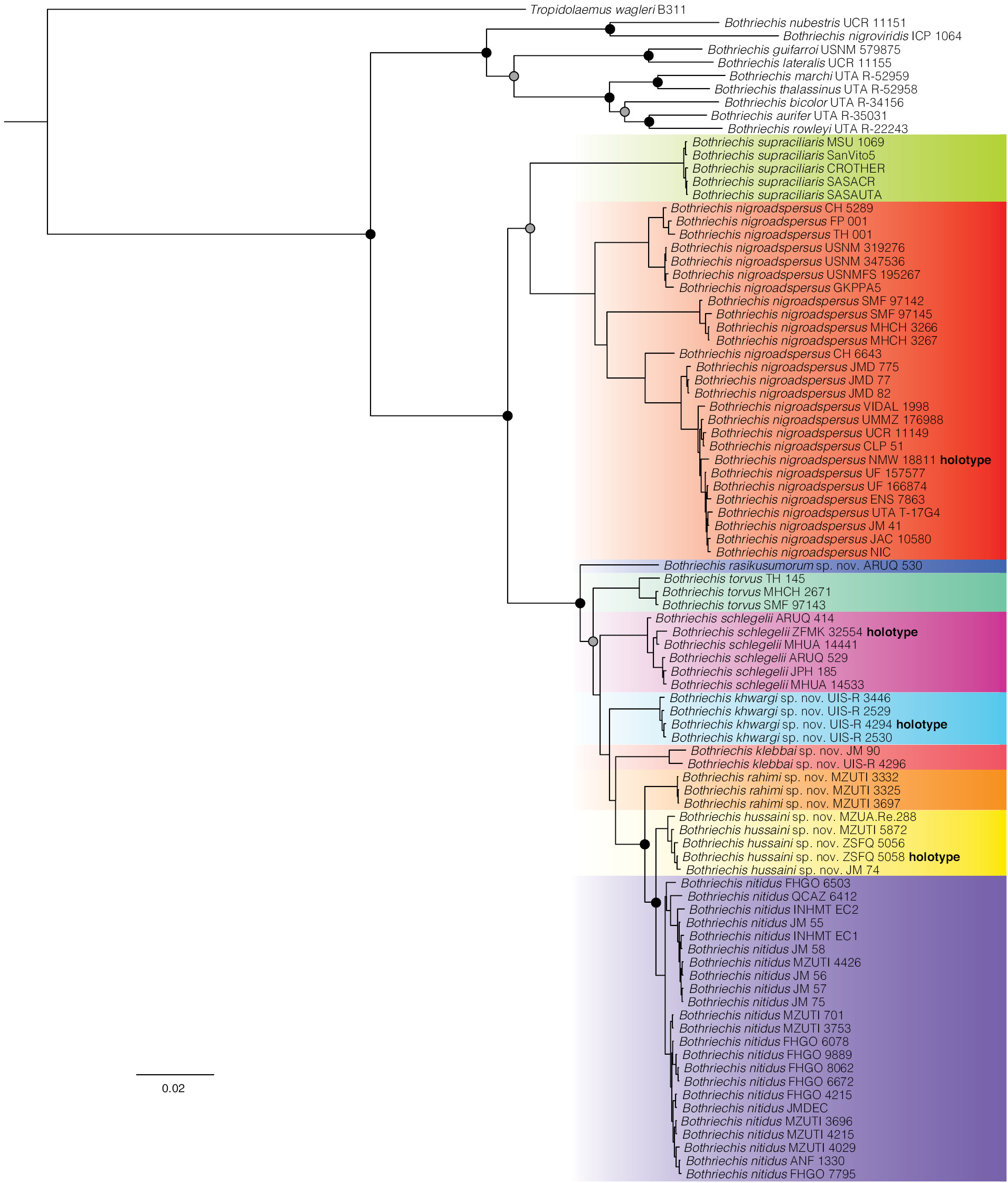
Phylogeny (Arteaga et al. 2024)

- Bothriechis
  - - B. schlegelli (Ecuador)
    - - B. supraciliaris
      - B. schlegelli (Costa Rica, Honduras, Nicaragua)
  - - - B. nigroviridis
      - - B. lateralis
        - B. guifarroi
    - - - - B. marchi (Honduras, Guatemala)
          - B. thalassinus
      - - - B. bicolor
          - - B. aurifer
            - B. rowleyi
