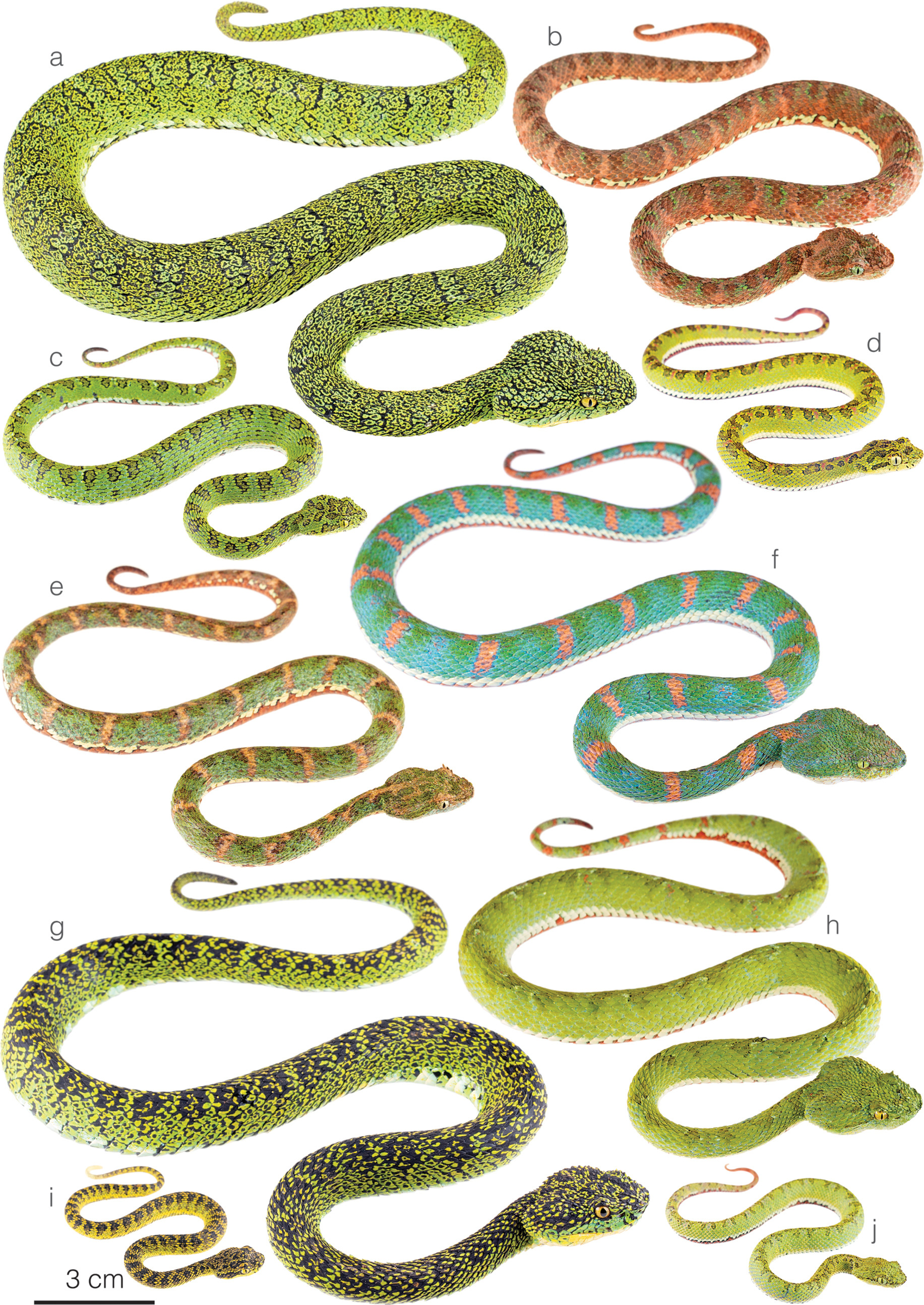
- Specimens from Ecuador
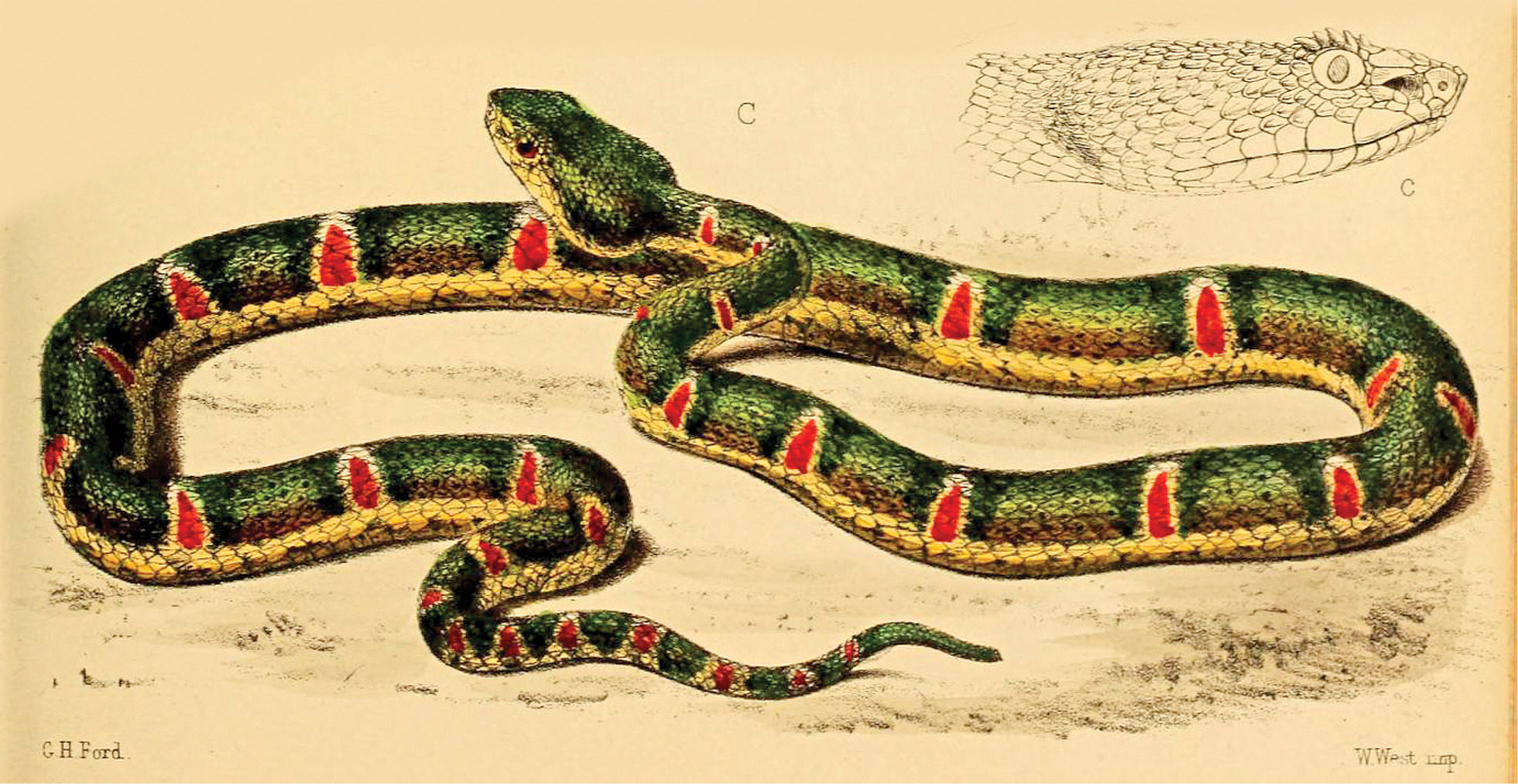
- 1859 illustration of the holotype

Scientific classification
- Kingdom: Animalia
- Phylum: Chordata
- Class: Reptilia
- Order: Squamata
- Suborder: Serpentes
- Family: Viperidae
- Genus: Bothriechis
- Species: B. nitidus

Binomial name
- Bothriechis nitidus Günther, 1859

= Bothriechis nitidus =

Species of snake

Bothriechis nitidus is a species of arboreal pit viper endemic to an area of 37,400 km^{2} in the humid forests of west-central Ecuador. Although once listed as a synonym of Bothriechis schlegelii, it was revalidated in a 2024 revision of the latter species.
