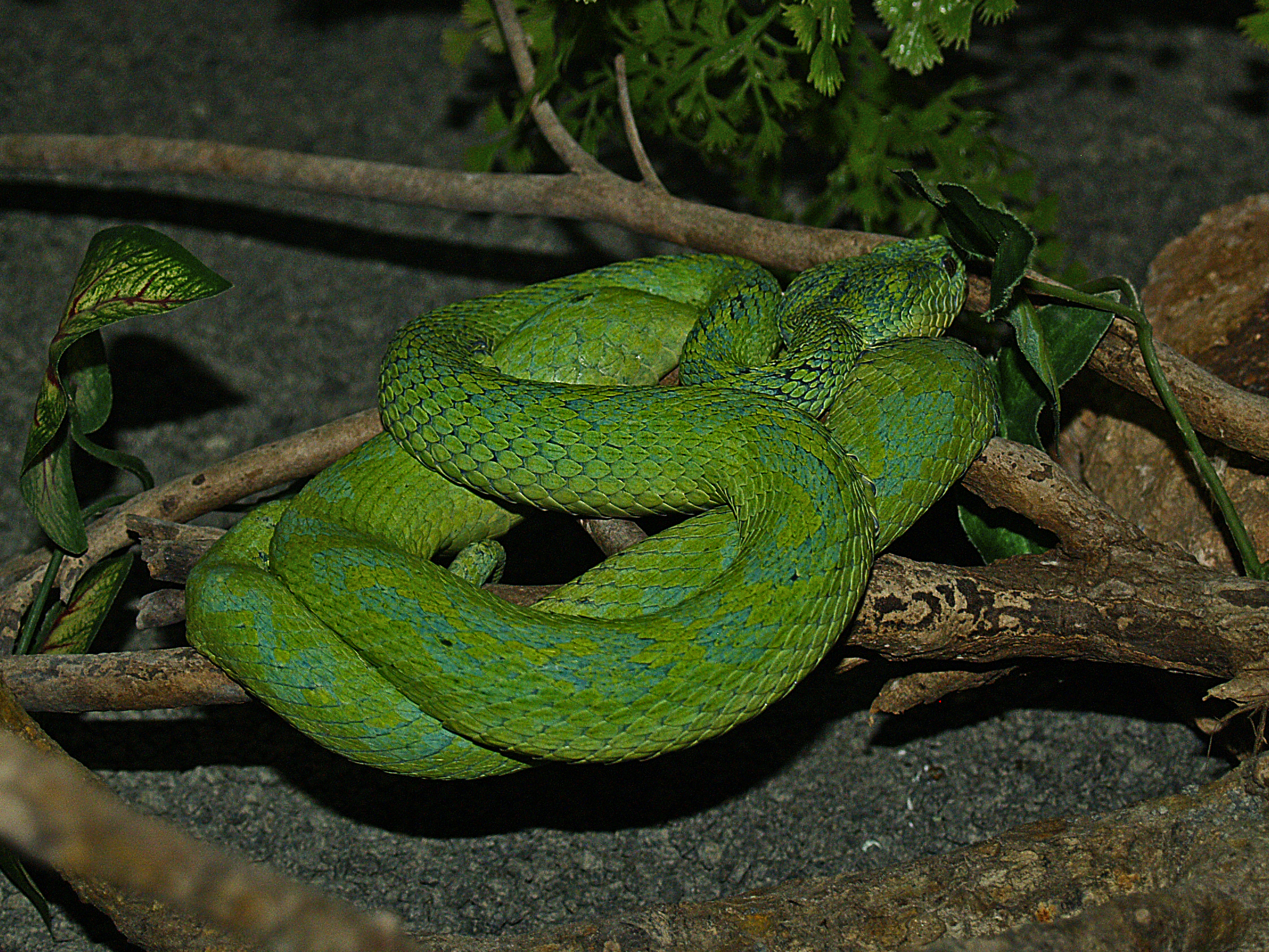

Conservation status
- Endangered (IUCN 3.1)

Scientific classification
- Kingdom: Animalia
- Phylum: Chordata
- Class: Reptilia
- Order: Squamata
- Suborder: Serpentes
- Family: Viperidae
- Genus: Bothriechis
- Species: B. thalassinus

Binomial name
- Bothriechis thalassinus Campbell & Smith, 2000

= Bothriechis thalassinus =

Species of snake

Bothriechis thalassinus, also known as Merendon palm-pitviper or Merendon palm pit viper, is a pit viper species native to Guatemala and Honduras.

== Description ==
This is a medium-sized pitviper with a slender body and strong prehensile tail. Adults are usually 60–80 centimetres (24–31 in) long, with a maximum recorded length of 97 centimetres (38 in). It has 21–23 dorsal scale rows at mid-body. The head and body usually have a greenish dorsal color, shading to yellow-greenish along the sides. The belly is generally lighter in color: cream, yellow-green or pale green. The dorsal pattern may have irregular blotches, turquoise to black, or speckling that doesn't reach very far down the sides. The head has two black stripes and black speckling on top, which are less visible towards the tail. Like all other pitvipers, B. thalassinus has heat sensitive organs, or loreal pits, located on either side of the head between the eye and the nostril.

== Geographic range ==
Its range extends from eastern Guatemala to western Honduras. In eastern Guatemala it is found in several mountain ranges, including Sierra de Caral in Izabal and the Sierra del Merendón in Zacapa.

== Habitat ==
It occurs in lower montane wet forest and lower montane moist forest at elevations of 885–1,730 metres (2,904–5,676 ft).

== Behavior ==
Like other Bothriechis members, this species appears to be mainly nocturnal and arboreal. It preys mostly on frogs, lizards, and sometimes small mammals or birds. B. thalassinus is not known to be an aggressive species, but may strike quickly when surprised or disturbed.

== Reproduction ==
Like most other pitvipers, B. thalassinus is ovoviviparous. Average litter size is probably less than 10–12 young per litter.

== Venom ==
The characteristics of its venom are not yet well known. It is mainly hemotoxic, and possibly contains mild neurotoxic or myotoxic factors. Seldom encountered by humans, there are very few reported bites of humans. Typical envenomation symptoms include local pain, swelling, mild local tissue necrosis, nausea, "tingling" of a digit or limb, and nausea. No confirmed deaths of humans have been reported for this species.
