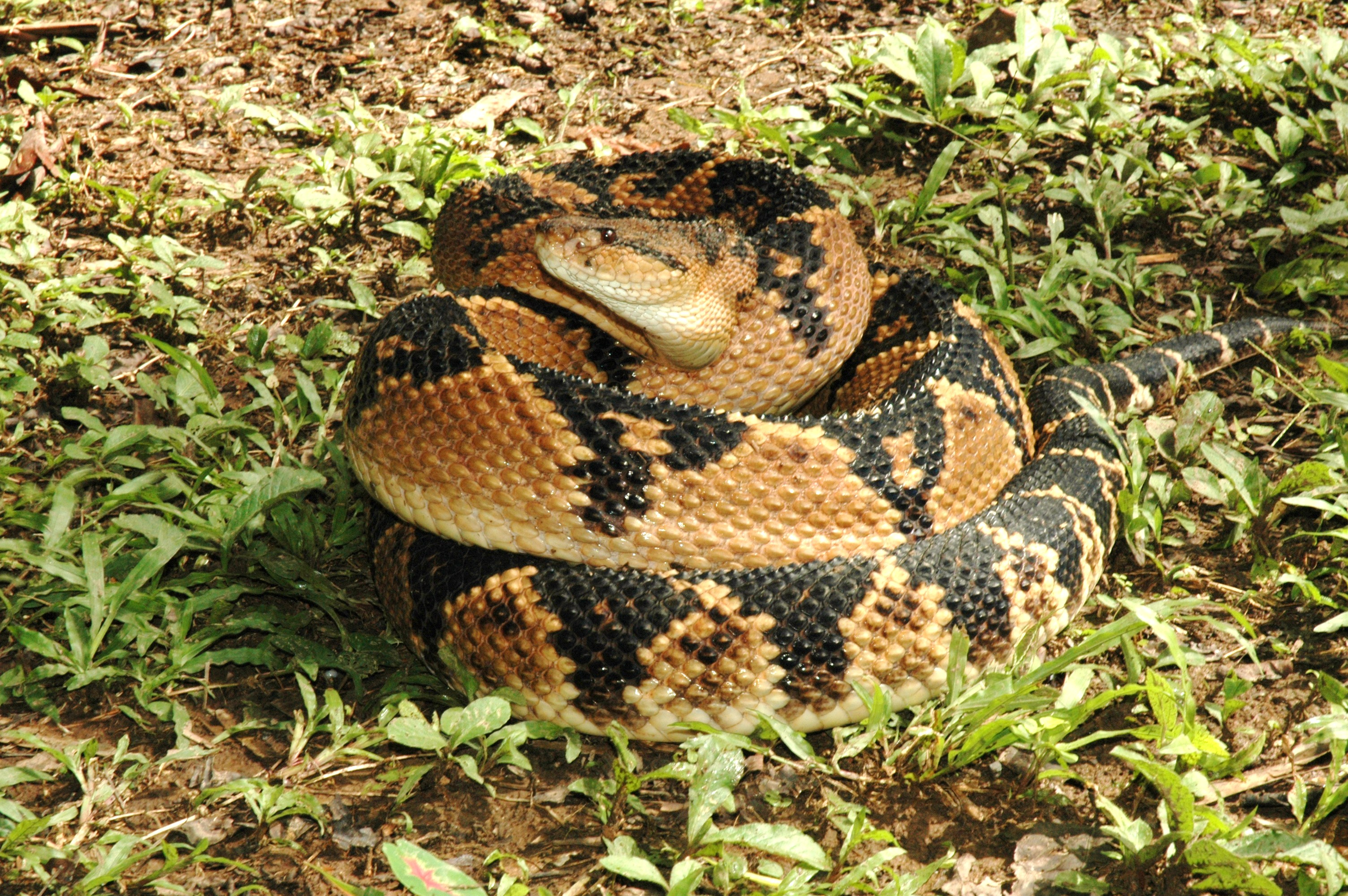

Conservation status
- Least Concern (IUCN 3.1)

Scientific classification
- Kingdom: Animalia
- Phylum: Chordata
- Class: Reptilia
- Order: Squamata
- Suborder: Serpentes
- Family: Viperidae
- Genus: Lachesis
- Species: L. muta

Binomial name
- Lachesis muta (Linnaeus, 1766)

Synonyms
- [Crotalus] mutus Linnaeus, 1766; [Coluber] crotalinus Gmelin, 1788; Scytale catenatus Latreille in Sonnini & Latreille, 1801; Scytale ammodytes Latreille in Sonnini & Latreille, 1801; Coluber alecto Shaw, 1802; Lachesis mutus — Daudin, 1803; Lachesis ater Daudin, 1803; Trigonocephalus ammodytes — Oppel, 1811; [Cophias] crotalinus — Merrem, 1820; Trigonoceph[alus]. crotalinus — Schinz, 1822; Lachesis muta — Schinz, 1822; Lachesis atra — Schinz, 1822; Scytale catenata — Schinz, 1822; Bothrops surucucu Wagler, 1824; C[rasedocephalus]. crotalinus — Gray, 1825; Lachesis mutus — A.M.C. Duméril, Bibron & A.H.A. Duméril, 1854; Lachesis mutus — Boulenger, 1896; Lachesis muta — Boettger, 1898; Lachesis muta muta — Taylor, 1951

= Lachesis muta =

Species of snake

Lachesis muta, also known as the Southern American bushmaster or Atlantic bushmaster, is a pit viper species found in South America, as well as the island of Trinidad in the Caribbean. Two subspecies are currently recognized, including the nominate subspecies described here.

== Taxonomy ==
Two additional subspecies, L. m. melanocephala and L. m. stenophrys, had earlier been recognized. However, both were elevated to species level by Zamudio and Green in 1997 (see L. melanocephala and L. stenophrys).

=== Subspecies ===
Subspecies	Taxon author	Common name	Geographic range
Lachesis muta muta	(Linnaeus, 1766)	South American bushmaster	Southeastern Colombia, eastern Ecuador, Peru, northern Bolivia, eastern and southern Venezuela, Trinidad, Guyana, Suriname, French Guiana and much of northern Brazil
Lachesis muta rhombeata	(Wied-Neuwied, 1824)	Atlantic Forest bushmaster	Coastal forests of southeastern Brazil (from southern Rio Grande do Norte to Rio de Janeiro).

== Description ==
Adults grow to an average of 2 to 2.5 m (6½-8 feet), although 3 m (10 feet) is not too unusual. The largest recorded specimen was 3.65 m (12 feet) long, making the species the longest of all vipers and the longest venomous snake in the Western Hemisphere. Lachesis muta is the third longest venomous snake in the world, exceeded in length only by the king cobra and the black mamba. Weight in this species is estimated at an average of 3 to 5 kg (6.6 to 11.0 lb), somewhat less than the heaviest rattlesnakes (like the eastern diamondback rattlesnake) or Bitis vipers (such as the Gaboon viper and rhinoceros viper).

The head is broad and distinct from the narrow neck. The snout is broadly rounded. There is no canthus. A pair of small internasals is present, separated by small scales. The supraoculars are narrow. Other parts of the crown are covered with very small scales. Laterally, the second supralabial forms the anterior border of the loreal pit, while the third is very large. The eye is separated from the supralabials by 4-5 rows of small scales.

The body is cylindrical, tapered and moderately stout. Midbody there are 31-37 nonoblique rows of dorsal scales which are heavily keeled with bulbous tubercles and feebly imbricate. There are 200-230 ventral scales. The tail is short with 32-50 mainly paired subcaudals, followed by 13-17 rows of small spines and a terminal spine. Like most New World pit vipers, Lachesis muta exhibits defensive tail vibration behavior in response to potential predatory threats

The color pattern consists of a yellowish, reddish or grey-brown ground color, overlaid with a series of dark brown or black dorsal blotches that form lateral inverted triangles of the same color. The lateral pattern may be precisely or indistinctly defined, normally pale at the center.

=== Venom ===
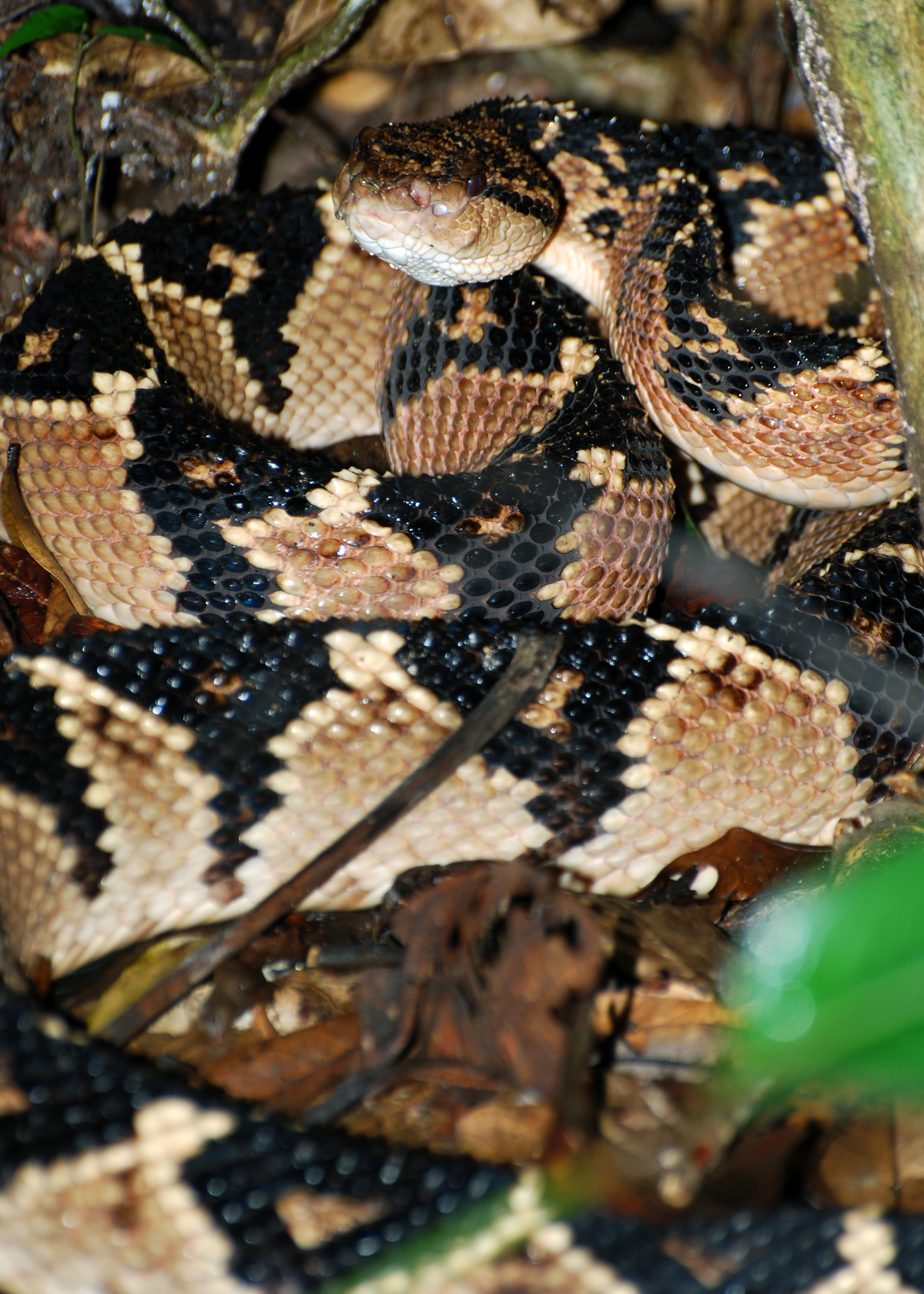
Lachesis muta muta in Ecuador

Some reports suggest that this species produces a large amount of venom that is weak compared to some other vipers. Others, however, suggest that such conclusions are not accurate. These animals are badly affected by stress and rarely live long in captivity. This makes it difficult to obtain venom in useful quantities and good condition for study purposes. For example, Bolaños (1972) observed that venom yield from his specimens fell from 233 mg to 64 mg while they remained in his care. As the stress of being milked regularly has this effect on venom yield, it is reasoned that it may also affect venom toxicity. This may explain the disparity described by Hardy and Haad (1998) between the low laboratory toxicity of the venom and the high mortality rate of bite victims.

Brown (1973) gives the following LD_{50} values for mice: 1.5 mg/kg IV, 1.6–6.2 mg/kg IP, 6.0 mg/kg SC. He also notes a venom yield of 200–411 mg. The bushmaster's venom has proteolytic activity, which destroys and causes lesions in the tissue, anti-coagulant, which causes incoagulable blood, hemorrhagic and neurotoxic, that acts mainly on vagal stimulation. The symptoms are quite similar to those caused by Bothrops, at the site of the bite there is pain, edema, ecchymosis, skin necrosis, abscesses, vesicles and blisters. The main complications at the bite site include necrosis, compartment syndrome, secondary infections and functional deficit. The systemic effects are characterized by hypotension, dizziness, visual disturbances, bradycardia, abdominal pain, nausea, vomiting and diarrhea. Other manifestations are also similar to Bothrops, including systemic hemorrhage and kidney failure. In Ilhéus, Bahia, Brazil, a 7-year-old boy was bitten when he left the house and stepped on one of these specimens, which then readily bit him; death was reported to have occurred approximately 15 minutes later. In 2005, in northwest Mato Grosso, a 5-year-old child also died, going into shock approximately 30 minutes after being bitten by a Lachesis muta and succumbing within 90 minutes.

== Etymology ==
Lachesis is one of the three Fates in Greek mythology and was supposed to assign to man his term of life—something this species is certainly capable of doing. The species is similar in appearance to rattlesnakes and vibrates its tail vigorously when alarmed, but has no rattle and was therefore called mutus (later muta), which is Latin for "dumb" or "mute". However, when in the undergrowth, the tail actually makes quite a loud rustling noise.

=== Common names ===
Known as the mapepire zanana or mapepire grande (pronounced ma-pa(y)-PEE za-Na-na or ma-pa(Y)-PEE GRAN-dey) in Trinidad, surucucú in the Amazon Basin (surucucu in a large part of Brazil), shushúpe in Peru, and pucarara in Bolivia. In Venezuela the species is known as cuaima or cuaima piña. In Colombia it is known as verrugosa or verrugoso due to the warty look of its scales, and in Suriname as makasneki and makkaslang.

It is called ĩtsãi in the Kwaza language of Rondônia, Brazil.

In the Shawi language of Peru, it is called na'shi.

== Distribution and habitat ==
L. muta is found in South America in the equatorial forests east of the Andes, and the island of Trinidad. The type locality is "Surinami" (Suriname). It occurs in primary and secondary forests; adjacent fields and cleared areas. In Trinidad it tends to prefer hilly and mountainous regions.

== Diet ==
Bushmasters prey primarily on rats and mice. Birds and reptiles may occasionally be eaten. Spiny rats are favored prey items in Costa Rica. Rice rats and agoutis are other favored prey. Other prey items include porcupines, squirrels, opossums, squirrel monkeys, and frogs.
