= Trigonocephalus =

Trigonocephalus is a taxonomic synonym that may refer to:

- Gloydius, a.k.a. Asian moccasins, a genus of venomous pitvipers found in Asia
- Lachesis, a.k.a. bushmasters, a genus of venomous pitvipers found in the remote, forested areas in Central and South America
