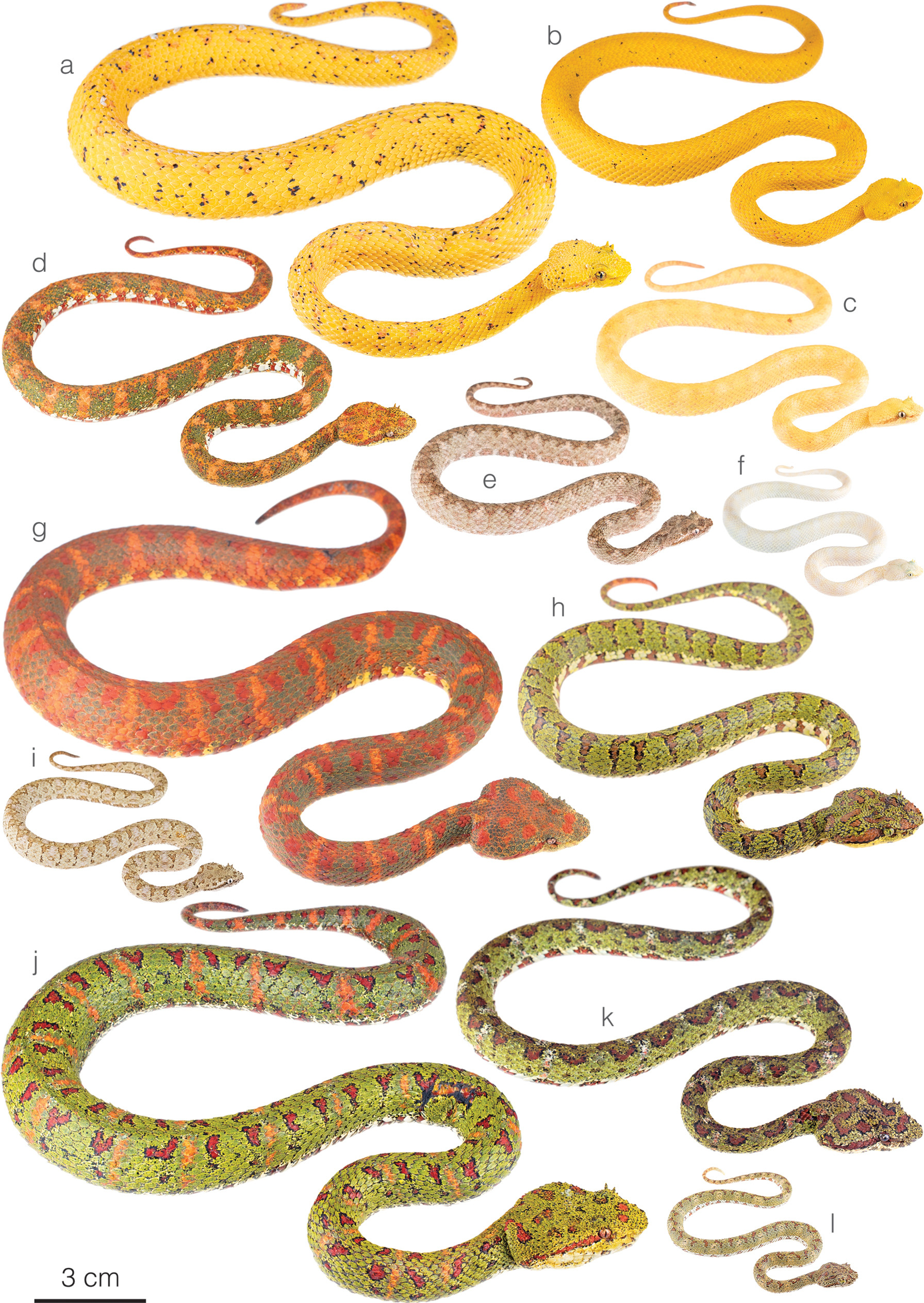
- Specimens from Costa Rica and Panama

Scientific classification
- Kingdom: Animalia
- Phylum: Chordata
- Class: Reptilia
- Order: Squamata
- Suborder: Serpentes
- Family: Viperidae
- Genus: Bothriechis
- Species: B. nigroadspersus

Binomial name
- Bothriechis nigroadspersus Steindachner, 1870
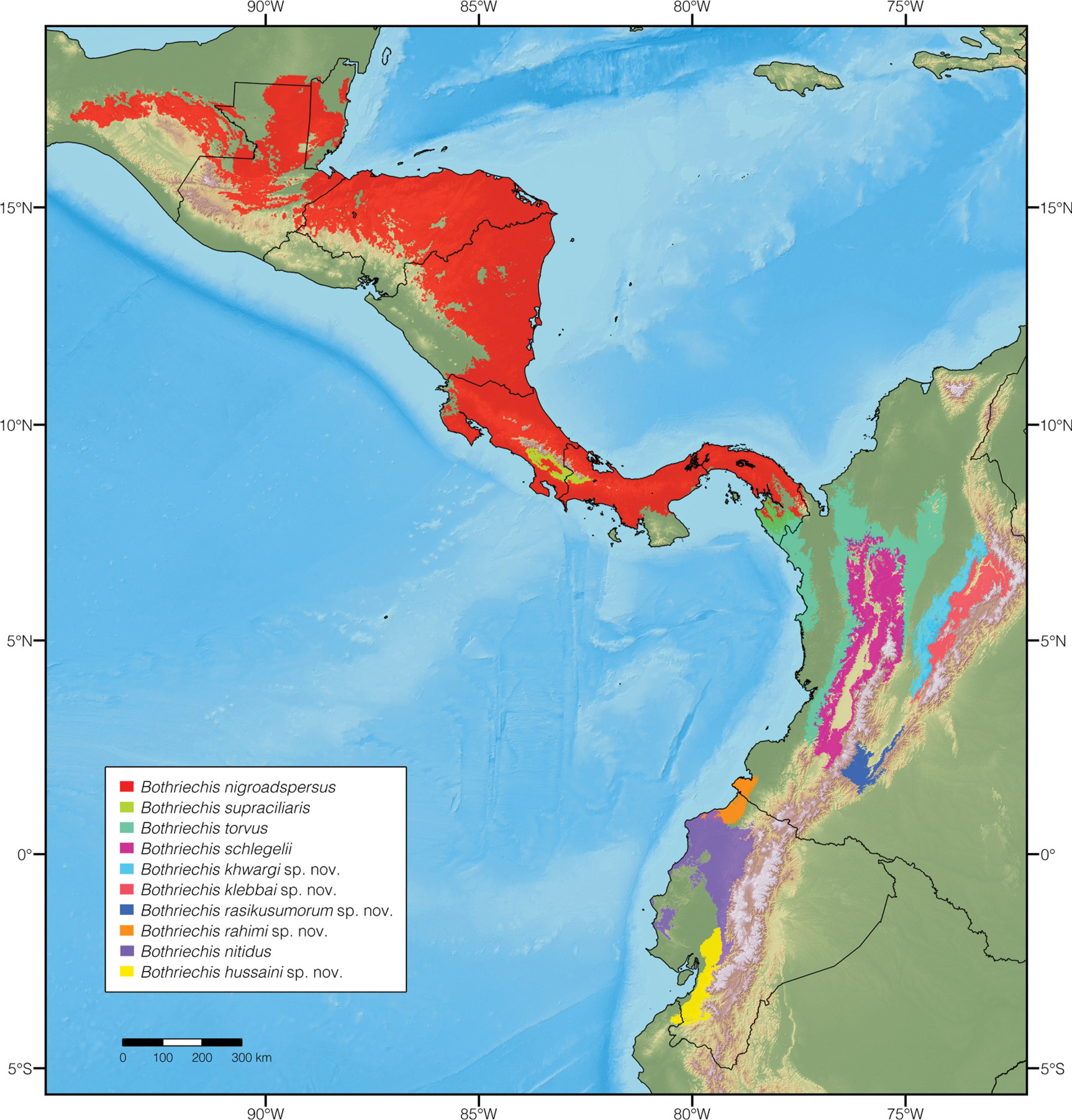
- Range of the B. schlegelii species complex. B. nigroadspersus in red.

= Bothriechis nigroadspersus =

Species of pit viper

The Central American eyelash-pitviper (Bothriechis nigroadspersus) (from Latin, nigrum, meaning "black", and adspersus meaning "sprinkled") is a species of pit viper.

Although once listed as a synonym of Bothriechis schlegelii, it was revalidated in a 2024 revision of the latter species.

== Range ==
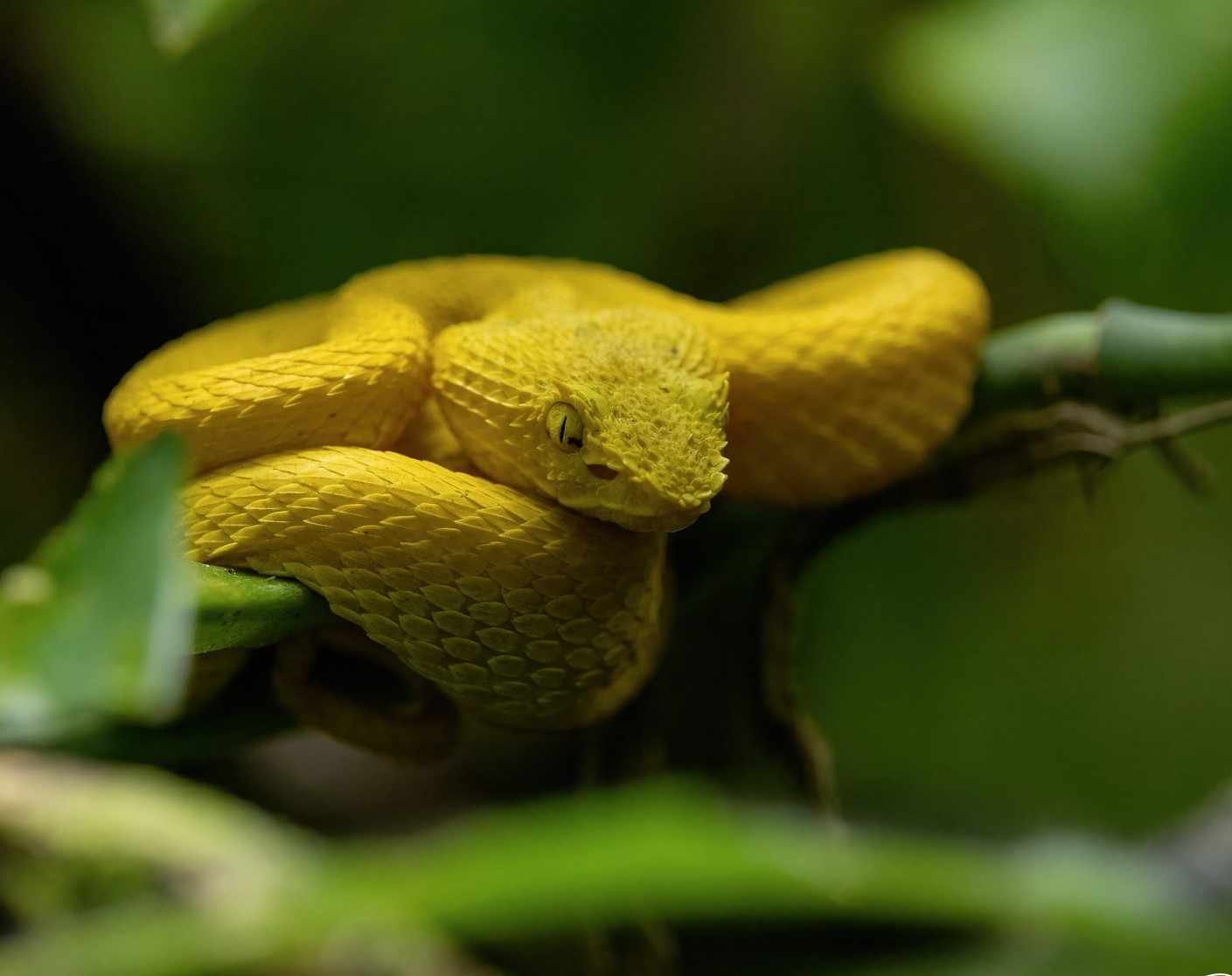
In Costa Rica

This species is widely distributed. It ranges across much of Mesoamerica, from as far north as the isthmus of Tehuantepec in Mexico to as far south as extreme northwestern Colombia (Cerro Tacarcuna) along the border with Panama.

Near Panama, the range of B. nigroadspersus slightly overlaps with that of B. supraciliaris.

The species has been recorded at elevations 0–1,434 m above sea level.

== Habitat ==
This arboreal species occurs in evergreen lowland/foothill forests, plantations, and rural gardens. They can be found in low shrubby vegetation but also in 32-35 metre high tree canopies.

== Biology ==
The species is mostly nocturnal. 70.2% of individuals relocate to a different perch each night, and only 6.4% remained at the same daytime perch site for more than two days. However, individuals may occasionally reside in the same perch for up to 14 days.

During the day, most individuals remain in hunting posture on or close to their night perches, although some may hide inside bromeliads, or remain active, moving at ground level or on vegetation.

It has been reported being hunted by great black hawks, laughing falcons and the black mussurana (Clelia clelia).

The species has been reported to live up to 20 years in captivity.

=== Diet ===
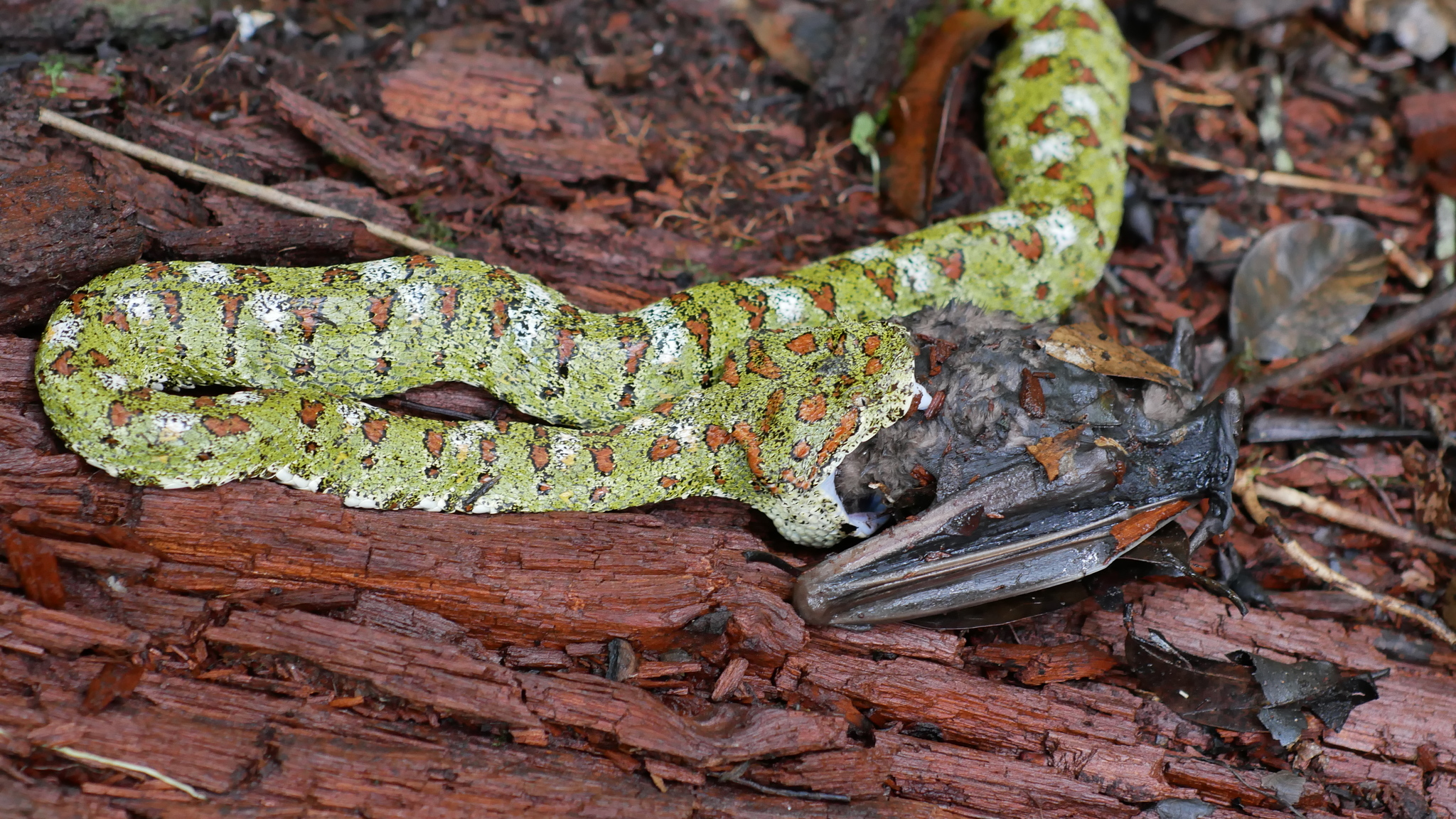
Eating a bat, Chiapas, Mexico

Although primarily ambush predators, they also forage actively for food.

Captive juveniles are known to feed on frogs, attracting them by means of moving their bright yellow tails as a lure. Wild adults are known to feed on frogs (primarily treefrogs and rainfrogs), lizards (anoles, whiptails, and geckos), birds (including hummingbirds), and mammals (bats, mice, and mouse opossums).

=== Reproduction ===
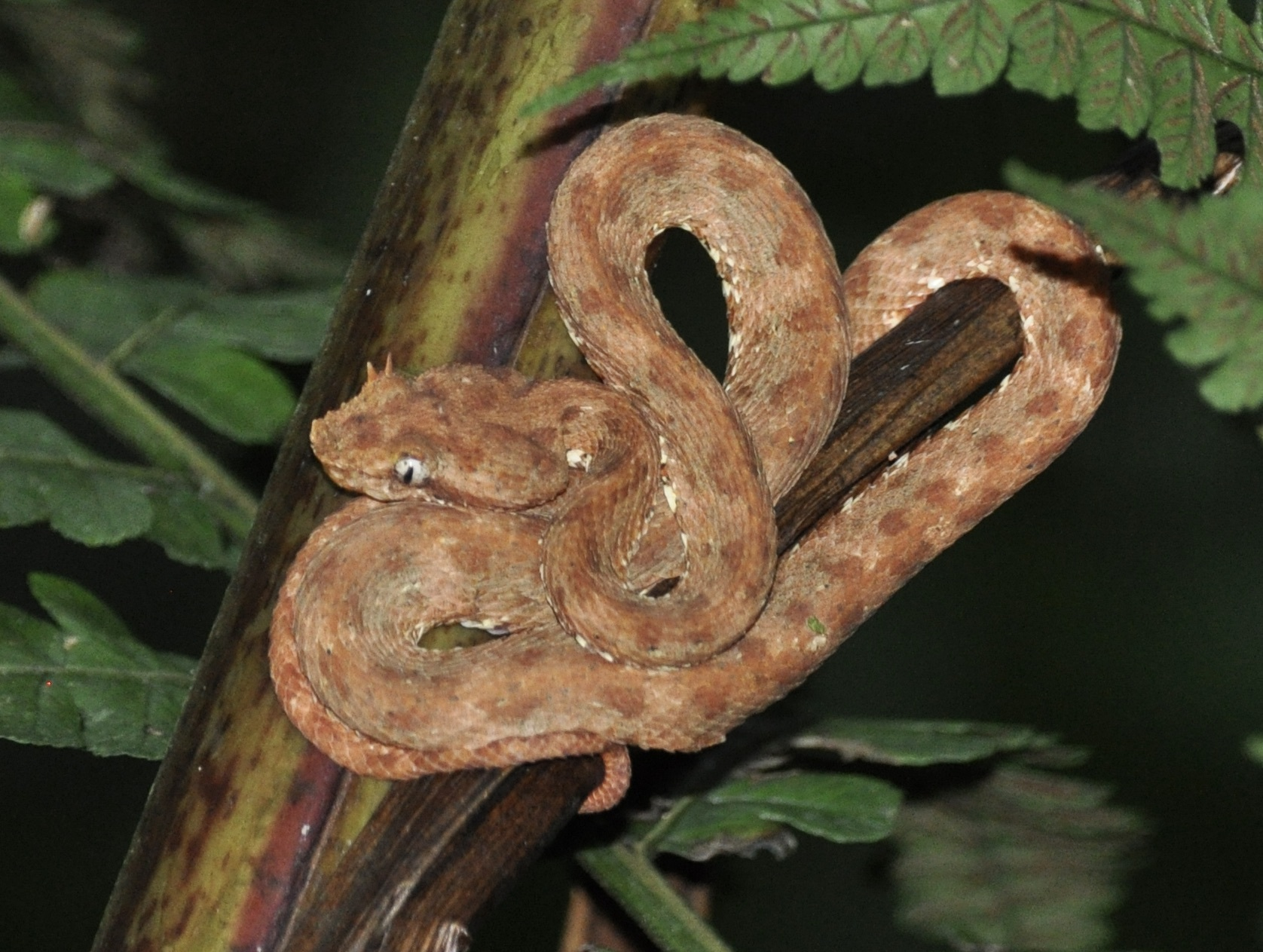
In Costa Rica

The species gives birth to live young. Breeding possibly coincides with the rainy season. Females become sexually mature at an age of less than three years and can produce more than one litter per year.

The gestation period is 150–166 days (~5 months), resulting in litters of 6–23 neonates that measure 16–22.5 cm in total length at birth.

The species is capable of storing sperm after mating; a female from Costa Rica produced a litter after presumably storing sperm for no less than ~35 months (slightly under three years). Similarly, a specimen from Lago Yojoa, Honduras, kept at Centro El Ocotal, produced a litter of four eggs and one live young after being kept in a terrarium without a male for 18 years.

== Venom ==
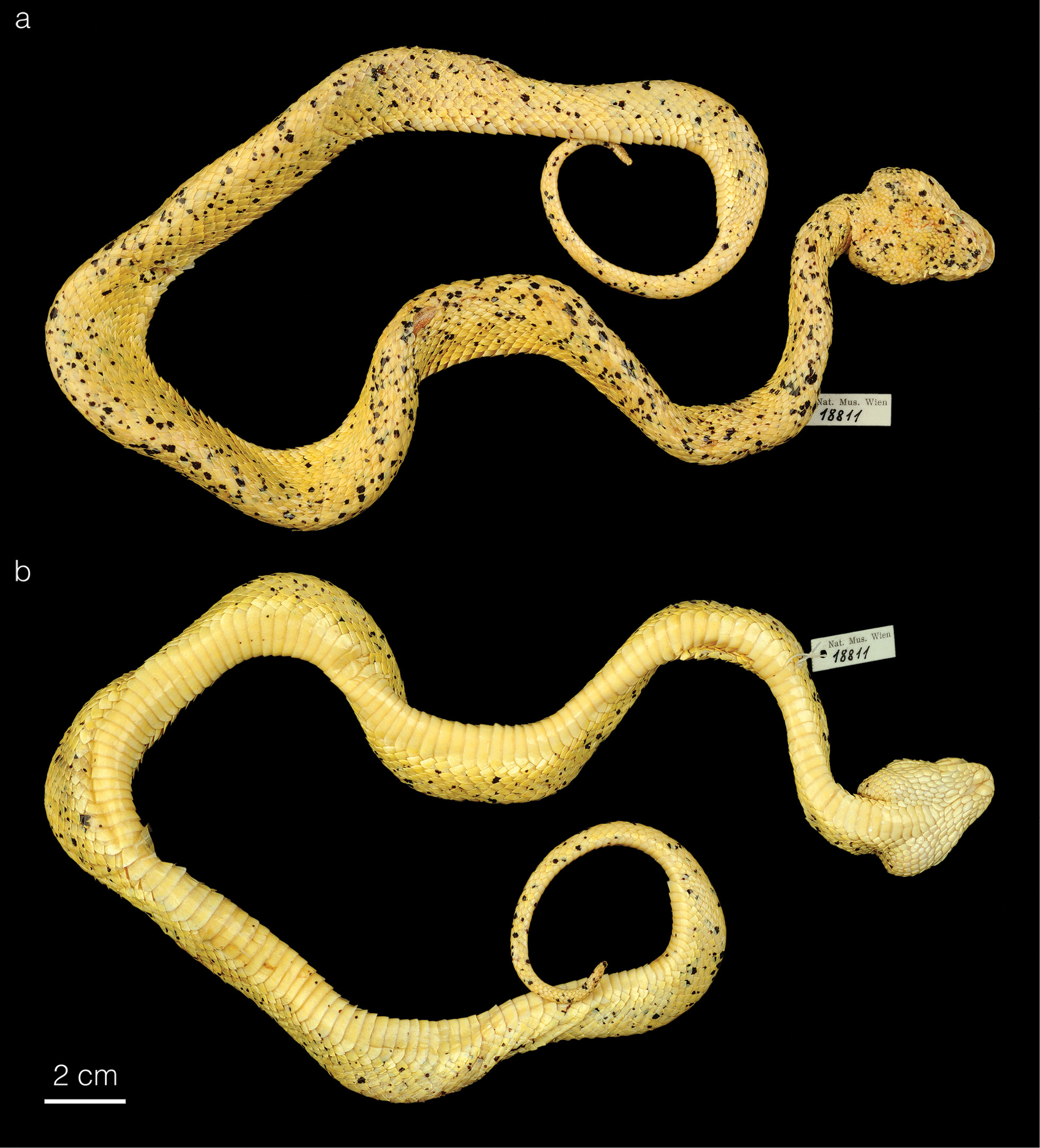
Holotype specimen (adult female)

In Costa Rica, 90-100 bites from this species occur per year, of which up to 6% of bites result in death. In 1979, 18.9% of snake bites in the country were attributable to this species.

The average bite injects ~0.5 cc of venom. The venom is hemotoxic and strongly myonecrotic (muscle tissue death) compared to other Central American vipers. In humans, it causes intense localized pain, progressive hemorrhagic edema, and less commonly hemorrhagic blisters or hives, ecchymoses, and necrosis.

Despite being closely related to Bothriechis torvus, their venom properties differ drastically. The venom of B. nigroadspersus is more edematous, hemorrhagic, and lethal. The LD_{50} of this species' venom is estimated as 1.7–5.6 mg/kg in B. nigroadspersus, as opposed to 9.24 mg/kg in B. torvus.
