= Lachesis muta rhombeata =

Conservation status
- Vulnerable (IUCN 2.3)

Scientific classification
- Kingdom: Animalia
- Phylum: Chordata
- Class: Reptilia
- Order: Squamata
- Suborder: Serpentes
- Family: Viperidae
- Genus: Lachesis
- Species: L. muta
- Subspecies: L. m. rhombeata

Trinomial name
- Lachesis muta rhombeata (Hoge & Romano, 1978)

Subspecies of snake

Lachesis muta rhombeata, also known as the Atlantic Forest bushmaster, is a venomous pit viper subspecies endemic to the Atlantic Forest of Brazil.
