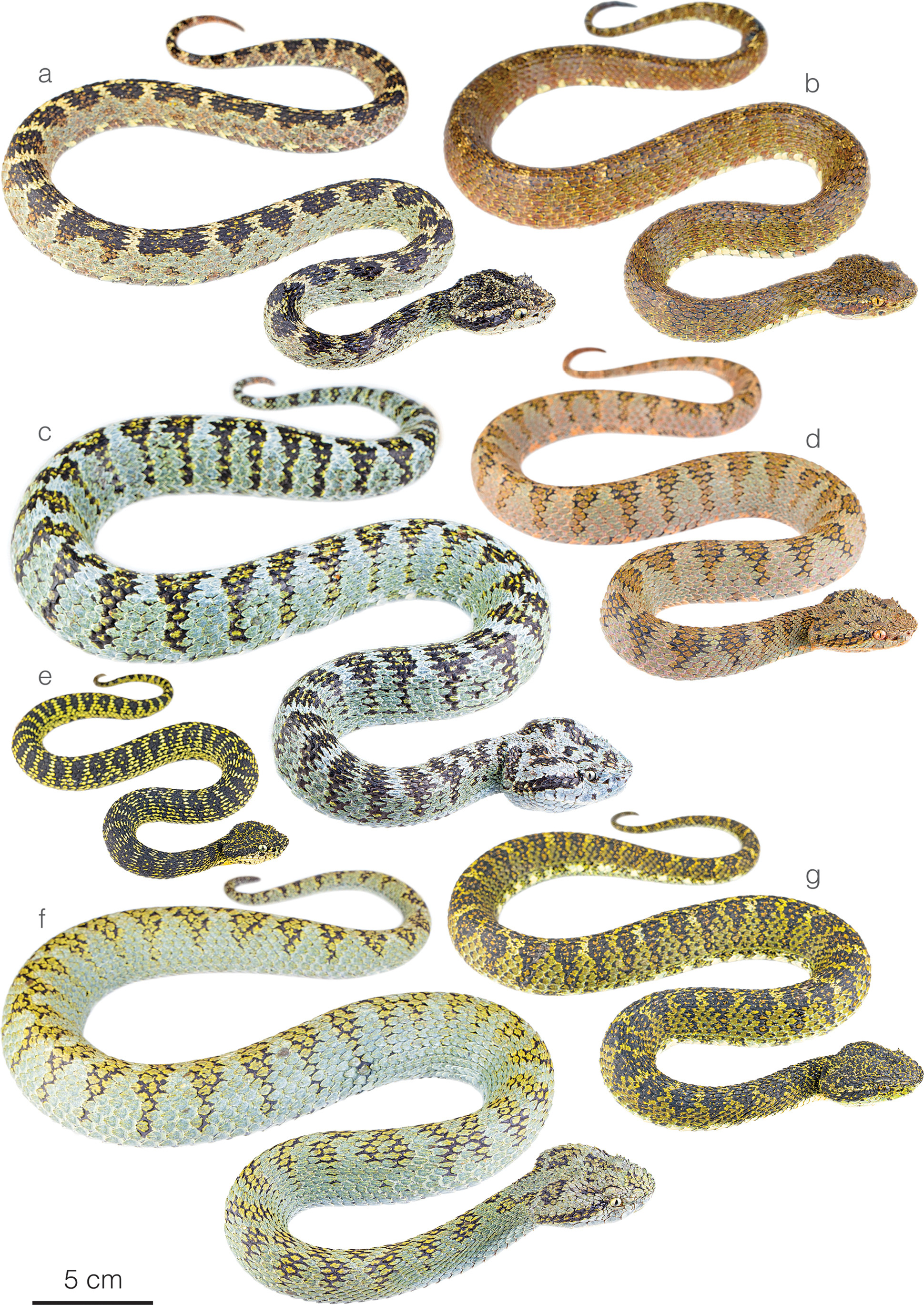

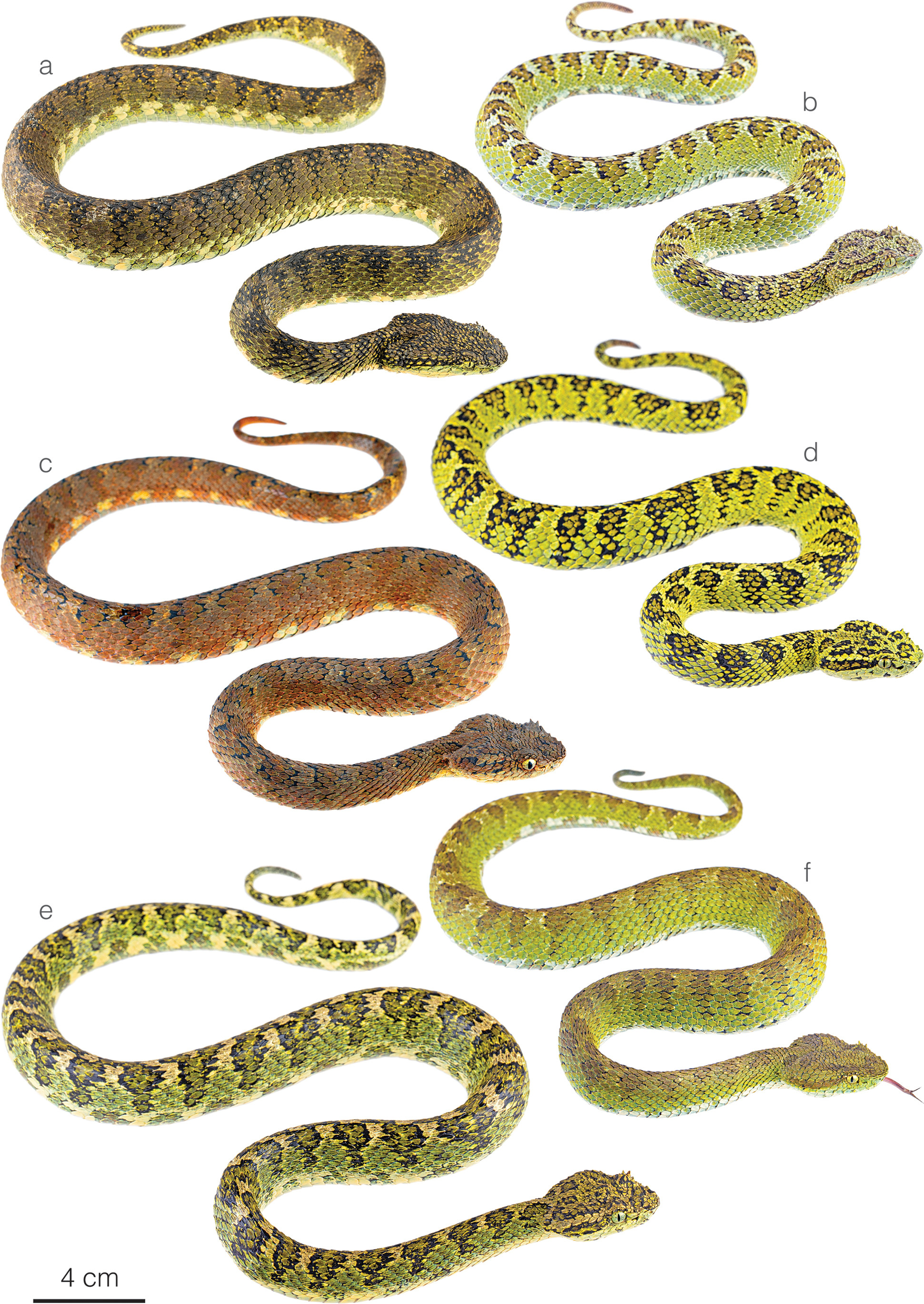
- Specimens from Colombia

Conservation status
- Least Concern (IUCN 3.1)

Scientific classification
- Kingdom: Animalia
- Phylum: Chordata
- Class: Reptilia
- Order: Squamata
- Suborder: Serpentes
- Family: Viperidae
- Genus: Bothriechis
- Species: B. schlegelii

Binomial name
- Bothriechis schlegelii (Berthold, 1846)

Synonyms
- List: Trigonocephalus Schlegelii Berthold, 1846; [Trigonocephalus] Schlegelii — Berthold, 1846; T[eleuraspis]. Schlegeli — Cope, 1860; B[othrops]. Schlegeli — Jan, 1863; Teleuraspis schlegelii — Cope, 1871; Bothrops Schlegelii — Jan & Sordelli, 1875; Th[anatos]. Schlegelii — Posada Arango, 1889; Th[anatophis]. Schlegelii — Posada Arango, 1889; Bothriechis schlegeli — Günther, 1895; Lachesis schlegelii — Boulenger, 1896; Thanatophis colgadora Garcia, 1896; Lachesis schlegeli — Boettger, 1898; Trimeresurus schlegelii — Mocquard, 1909; Bothriechis schlegelii — Cuesta Terron, 1930; Bothrops schlegelii supraciliaris Taylor, 1954; [Bothrops schlegelii schlegelii ] — Taylor, 1954; Bothrops schlegeli supraciliaris — Duellman & Berg, 1962; [Bothrops supraciliaris] — Stuart, 1963; Bothrops schlegeli — Hoge, 1966; Trigonocephalus schlegelii — Hoge, 1966; Bothriechis schlegelii — Campbell & Lamar, 1989

= Bothriechis schlegelii =

Species of reptile

Bothriechis schlegelii, known commonly as the highland eyelash-pitviper, Schlegel's eyelash-pitviper, eyelash viper or eyelash palm viper, is a species of pit viper in the family Viperidae, native to Colombia.

Somewhat small, arboreal snakes, B. schlegelii is perhaps best known for the namesake superciliary ("eyelash") scales above its eyes, and for having distinctly keeled or "raised" scales covering the bulk of its body. The species is also known for producing a veritable rainbow of color forms (morphs).

No subspecies are currently recognized as being valid.

== Taxonomy ==
Historically, a montane form was recognized by some authorities, which was treated either as a subspecies (B. s. supraciliaris) or as a species (B. supraciliaris). Found in the province of San José in Costa Rica, it was sometimes referred to as the eyelash mountain viper, while more recent publications recognizing the species designation refer to it as the blotched palm-pitviper.

Although considered to likely contain multiple species for some time, the great variety of colour patterns in the species has previously made this difficult to verify.

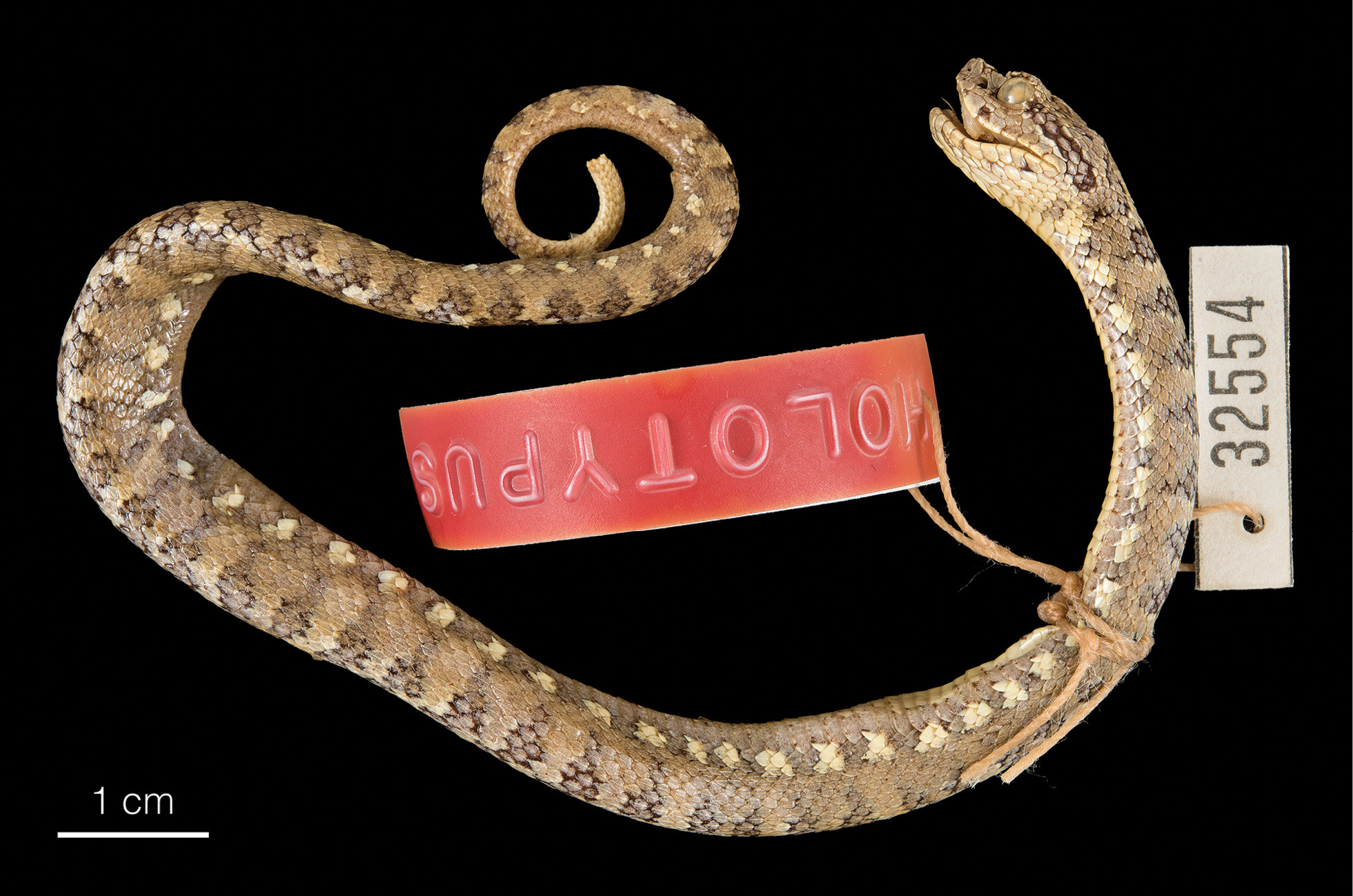
Holotype specimen (juvenile)

In 2024, a systematic revision of B. schlegelii through DNA-sequencing finally split it into an additional number of species: B. klebbai, B. rasikusumorum, B. khwargi, B. rahimi, and B. hussaini. At the same time, names that were previously synonyms were revalidated: B. nigroadspersus (Steindachner, 1870), B. nitidus (Günther, 1859), and B. torvus (Posada Arango, 1889a). Due to the close relation between these species alongside B. supraciliaris, they are considered to be part of a B. schlegelii species complex, otherwise referred to as the "eyelash clade" within Bothriechis. These "eyelash vipers" form a monophyletic clade that is sister to the rest of the genus.

== Etymology ==
The specific name schlegelii honors Hermann Schlegel, who was a German ornithologist and herpetologist.

Common names of B. schlegelii include the eyelash viper, eyelash pit viper, eyelash palm viper, eyelash palm-pitviper, Schlegel's viper, Schlegel's pit viper, Schlegel's palm viper, eyelash snake, eyelash lancehead, eyelash mountain viper, and horned palm viper. In Spanish, the primary language of countries comprising its distribution, common names include bocaracá, oropel (golden morph), víbora bocaracá, toboba pestañas, víbora de pestañas (eyelash viper), and serpiente loro (parrot snake).

== Distribution ==
Previously thought to range from southern Mexico to northwestern South America, a systematic revision of the species in 2024 caused many of the populations in its purported range to become their own separate species. Although these species are very closely related, this restricts the range of B. schlegelii sensu stricto to Colombia, in primarily highland regions.

== Description ==
The eyelash viper is a relatively small species of pitviper, with adults ranging from 55–82 cm (22–32 in) long, and females being longer and more variable in size than males, which can grow to 69 cm (27 in) long. It has a wide, triangular-shaped head, and eyes with vertical pupils. Like all pit vipers, it is solenoglyphous, having large, hypodermic needle-like fangs in the front of the upper jaw that fold back when not in use, and has heat sensitive organs, or pits, located on either side of the head between the eye and nostril.

Its most distinguishing feature, and origin of its common name, is the set of modified scales above the eyes that look much like eyelashes. The eyelashes are thought to aid in camouflage, breaking up the snake's outline among the foliage where it hides. The eyelash viper occurs in a wide range of colors. No external features distinguish the two sexes.

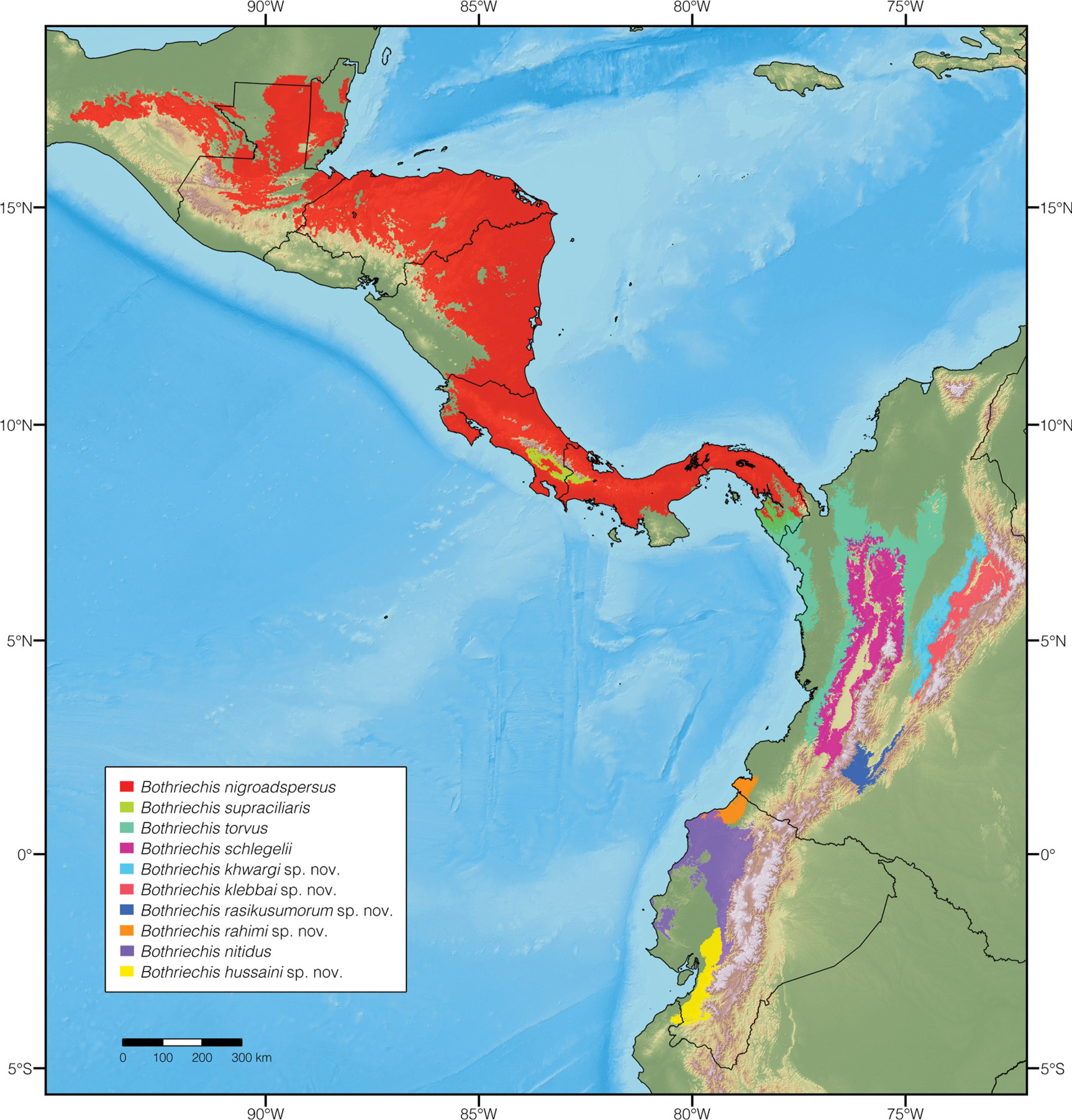
Range of the B. schlegelii species complex.

== Behavior ==
Like other Bothriechis species, B. schlegelii is adapted to a nearly completely arboreal lifestyle, possessing a strong, prehensile tail with which it secures itself around tree limbs, often coiled into a tight bundle during the day, as the species is primarily nocturnal. After dark, the eyelash viper awakens and awaits the presence of small, tree-dwelling animals that may cross its path, including mammals (rodents, bats, mouse opossums), amphibians (cloud forest landfrogs, fleshbelly frogs, tree frogs), birds (hummingbirds) or lizards (anoles, geckos, juvenile iguanas, whiptails), as well as occasionally fish.

In typical ambush-predator fashion, B. schlegelii waits patiently for potential, unsuspecting prey to wander by. In some cases, individuals have been known to select specific ambush sites, returning each year in-time for the spring bird migration. Studies have indicated that individuals of B. schlegeli perfect their own strike accuracy with practice, over time. Sometimes, B. schlegelii (especially juveniles) will employ what is known as "caudal luring", wriggling their tail in a "worm"-like fashion to entice potential prey, such as hungry frogs or lizards, to move within striking-range.

The eyelash viper is not known to be an aggressive snake towards humans, and is likely to be avoidant of creatures larger than itself, but will not hesitate to strike if repeatedly harassed. Certain local mythologies and folktales (notably in remote areas of northern South America) describe how after one is bitten by an eyelash viper, the snake will "wink" its "eyelashes" at the victim. In reality, no snake is physiologically capable of such behaviors as they possess no true eyelids and cannot close their eyes; however, most reptiles possess a thin, membranous "eyelid" as a retractable "shield" for their eyes, mainly when resting.

== Venom ==
=== Composition ===
The most important components of B. schlegeli venom are phospholipase A2 related to the production of edema, tissue damage and myotoxicity, metalloproteases with dermonecrosis, L-amino acid oxidases with tissue damage, serine proteases with tissue damage and hemorrhagic diathesis, lectin type C with tissue damage and hemorrhagic diathesis, disintegrins with detachment of cells from their extracellular matrix leading to blisters and platelet function impairment, bradykinin-potentiating peptides with hypotension, enzymes that degrade fibrinogen, plasminogen activators, prothrombin activators, factor V activators, factor X activators, and anticoagulant activities (including inhibitors of prothrombinase complex formation, inhibitors of thrombin, phospholipases, and protein C activators).

=== Clinical management ===
Snakebites inflicted by B. schlegelii in humans are characterized by pain, edema, and ecchymosis at the site of the bite, rarely with blisters, local necrosis, or defibrination. Some investigations using venom samples of B. schlegelii from the northern region of Colombia have reported a typical bothropic envenomation characterized by pain, rapid local tissue damage, edema and inflammatory reactions at the site of the bite, followed by systemic alterations such as coagulopathy and acute renal failure.

== Reproduction ==
The eyelash viper reaches sexual maturity at around two years of age, and the ovoviviparous species reproduces throughout the year in warm environments. Females carry eggs for around six months before they hatch internally, where the young complete their development. Pregnant females have enlarged lower abdomens, and may stop eating in later stages of pregnancy. In a typical brood they give birth to 2–20 live young, which are 15–20 cm (6–8 in) in length and appear physically similar to adults.

Males engage in a sometimes hours-long courtship ritual called a "dance of the adders", in which two males posture and intimidate one another in an upright, "cobra-like" stance until one is pushed away or falls to the ground. They are polygynous, and usually mate at night.

== Conservation ==
Eyelash vipers were evaluated for the IUCN Red List as being of least concern for extinction in 2013, having been removed from CITES Appendix III in 2002. While not listed as threatened, they are at risk of habitat loss from increased deforestation for timber, agriculture, and urbanization. However, the species is adaptable and can live in secondary forests as well as coffee and banana plantations.

== Gallery ==
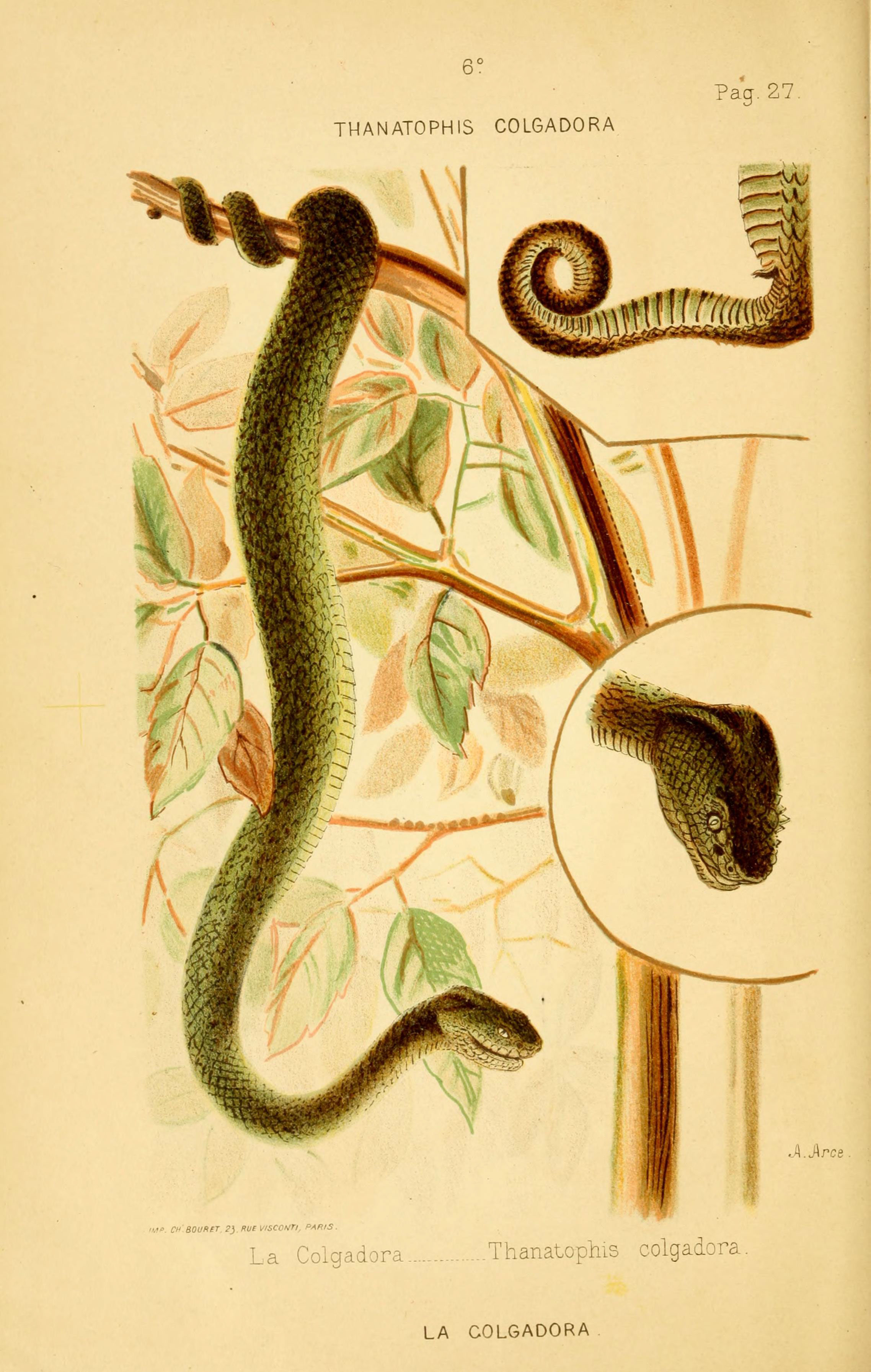
Illustration

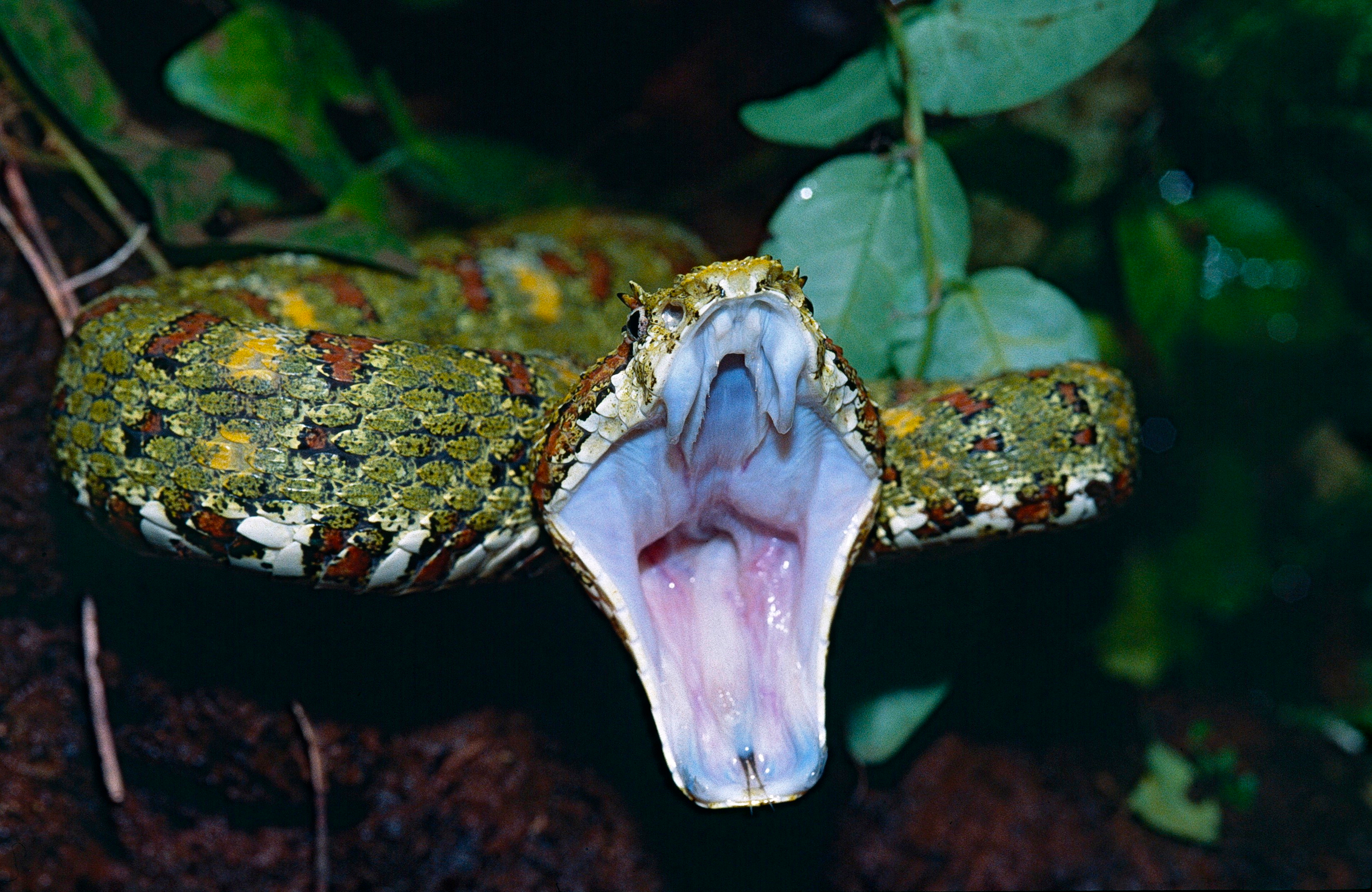
Eyelash Viper (Bothriechis schlegelii) female threat display (captive specimen)

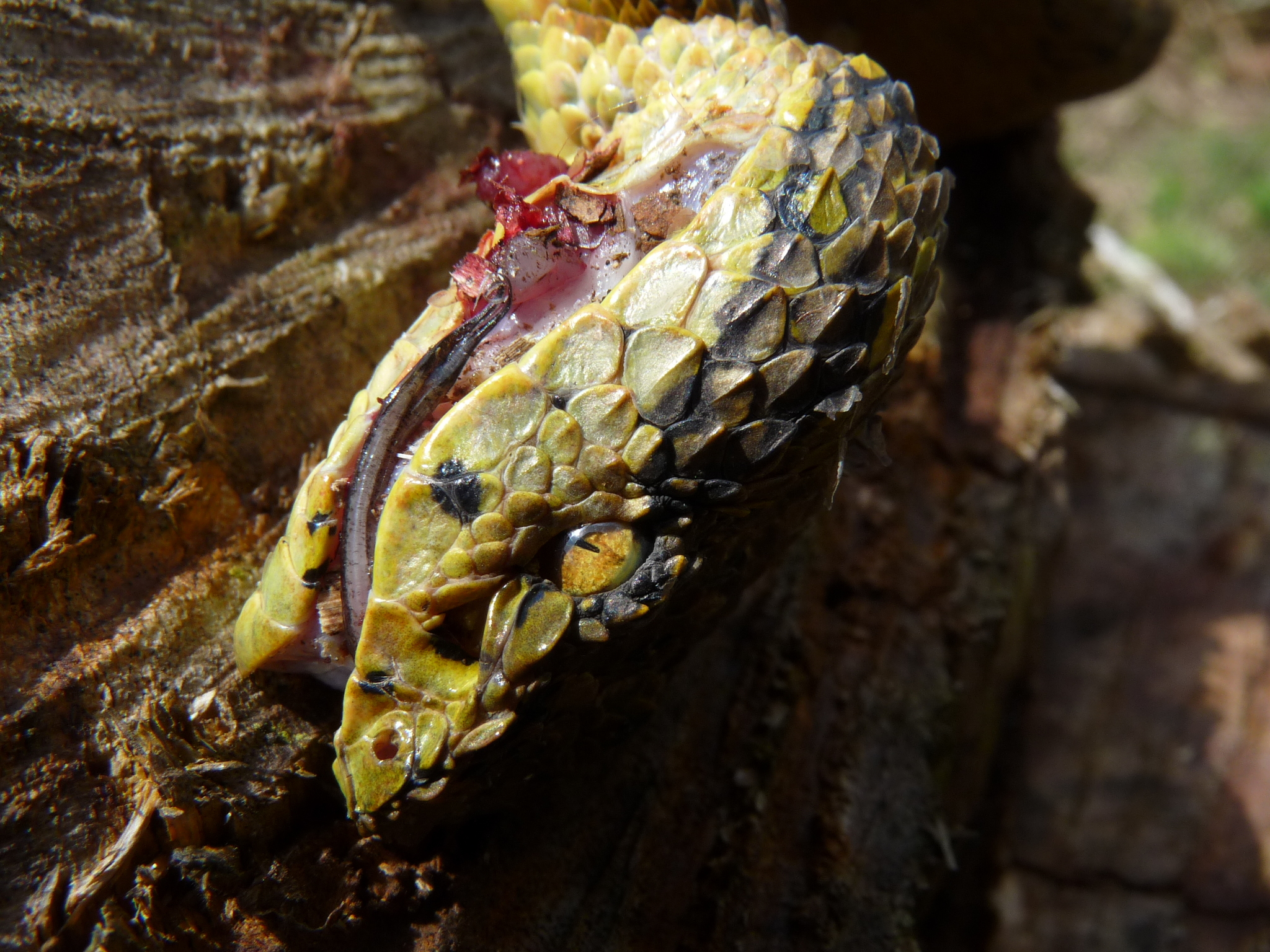

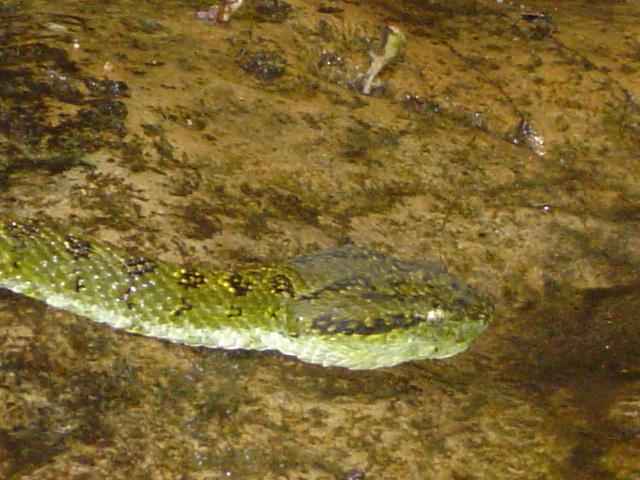

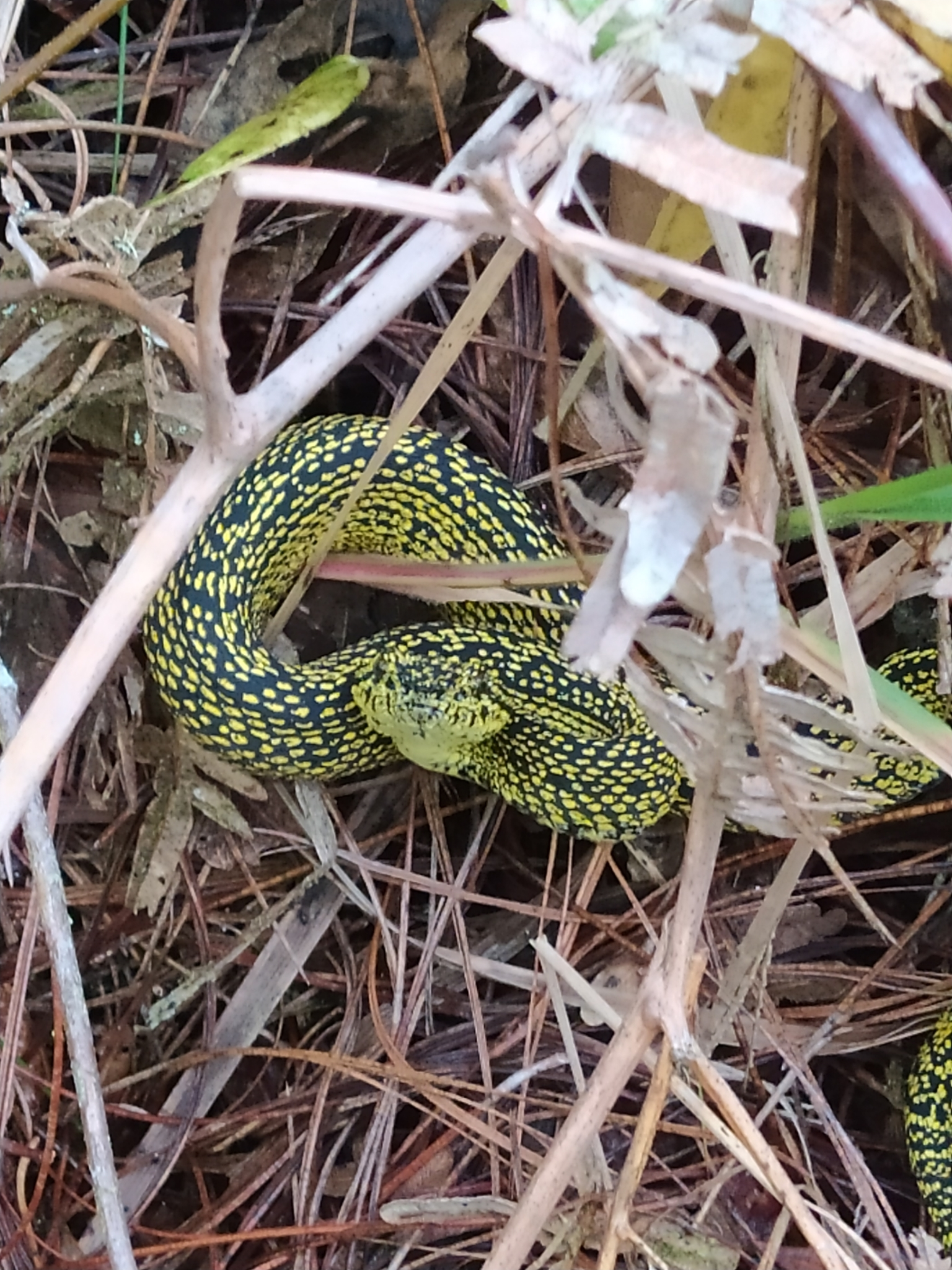
