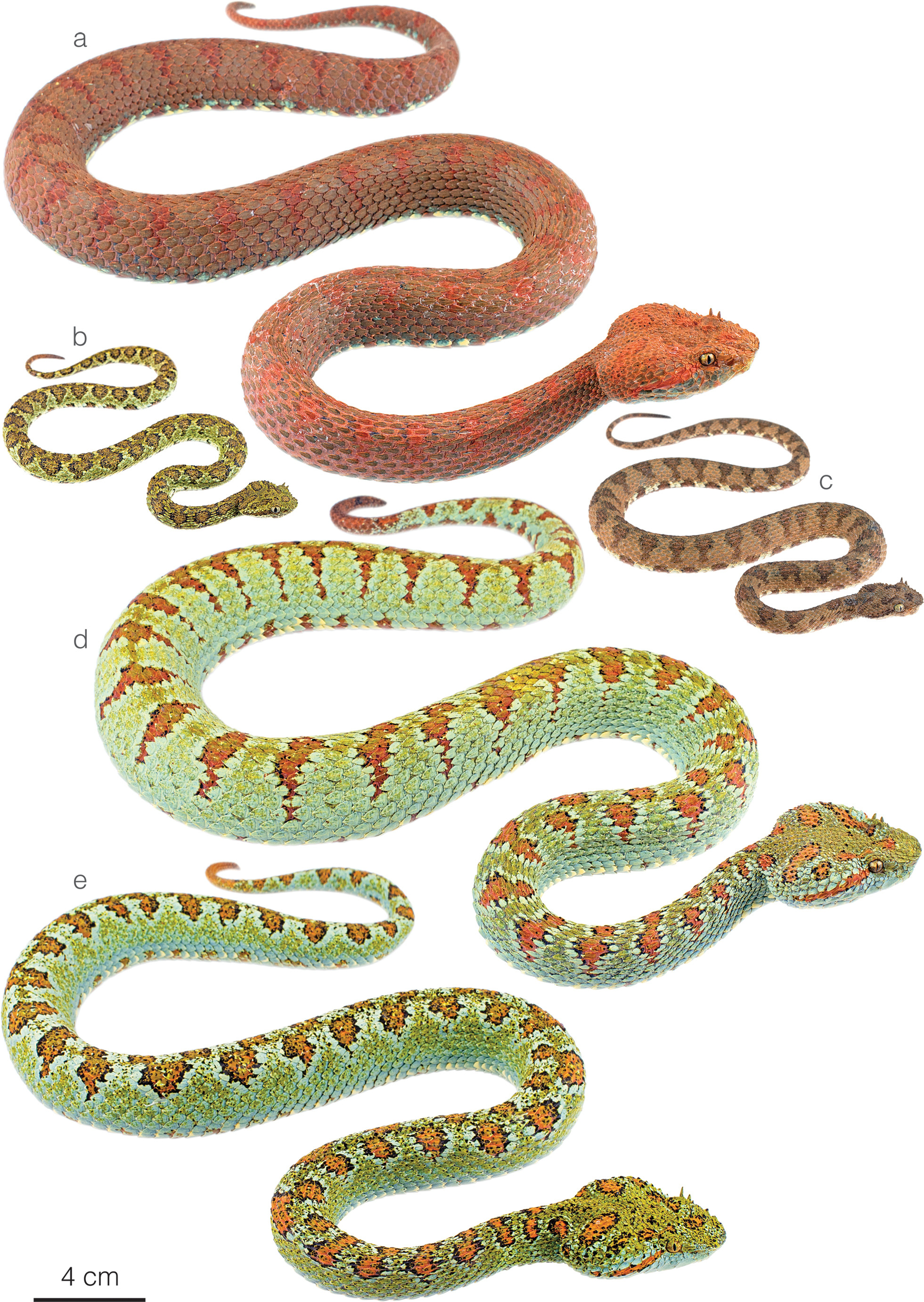
- Photo of specimens from Costa Rica
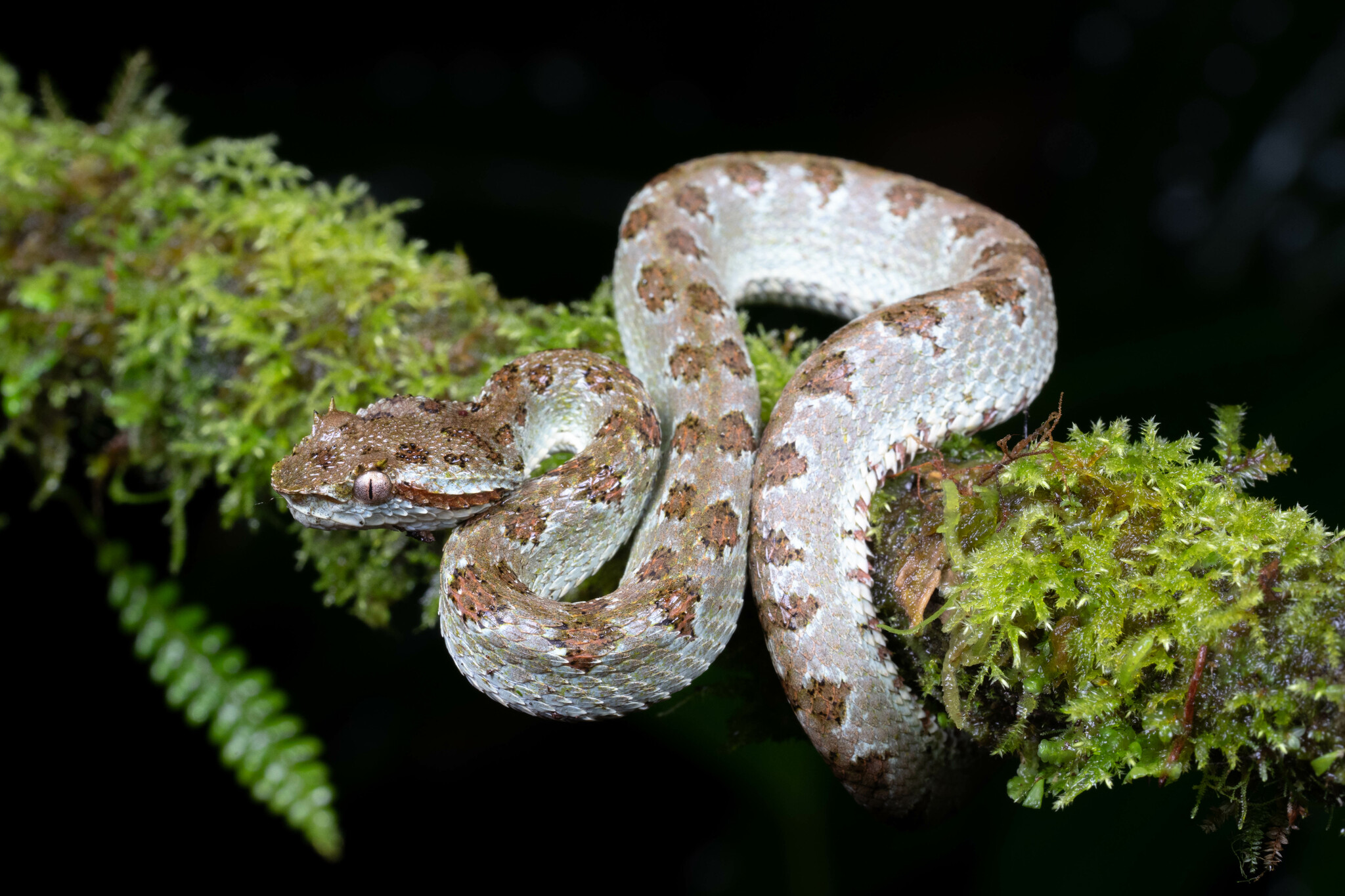

Conservation status
- Least Concern (IUCN 3.1)

Scientific classification
- Kingdom: Animalia
- Phylum: Chordata
- Class: Reptilia
- Order: Squamata
- Suborder: Serpentes
- Family: Viperidae
- Genus: Bothriechis
- Species: B. supraciliaris

Binomial name
- Bothriechis supraciliaris (Taylor, 1954)

Synonyms
- Bothrops schlegelii supraciliaris Taylor, 1954; Bothriechis supraciliaris — Solórzano et al., 1998

= Bothriechis supraciliaris =

Species of snake

Bothriechis supraciliaris, commonly known as the blotched eyelash-pitviper, is a species of venomous snake in the subfamily Crotalinae of the family Viperidae. The species is endemic to southern Pacific parts of Talamanca Mountain Range in Costa Rica and western Panama.

== Description ==
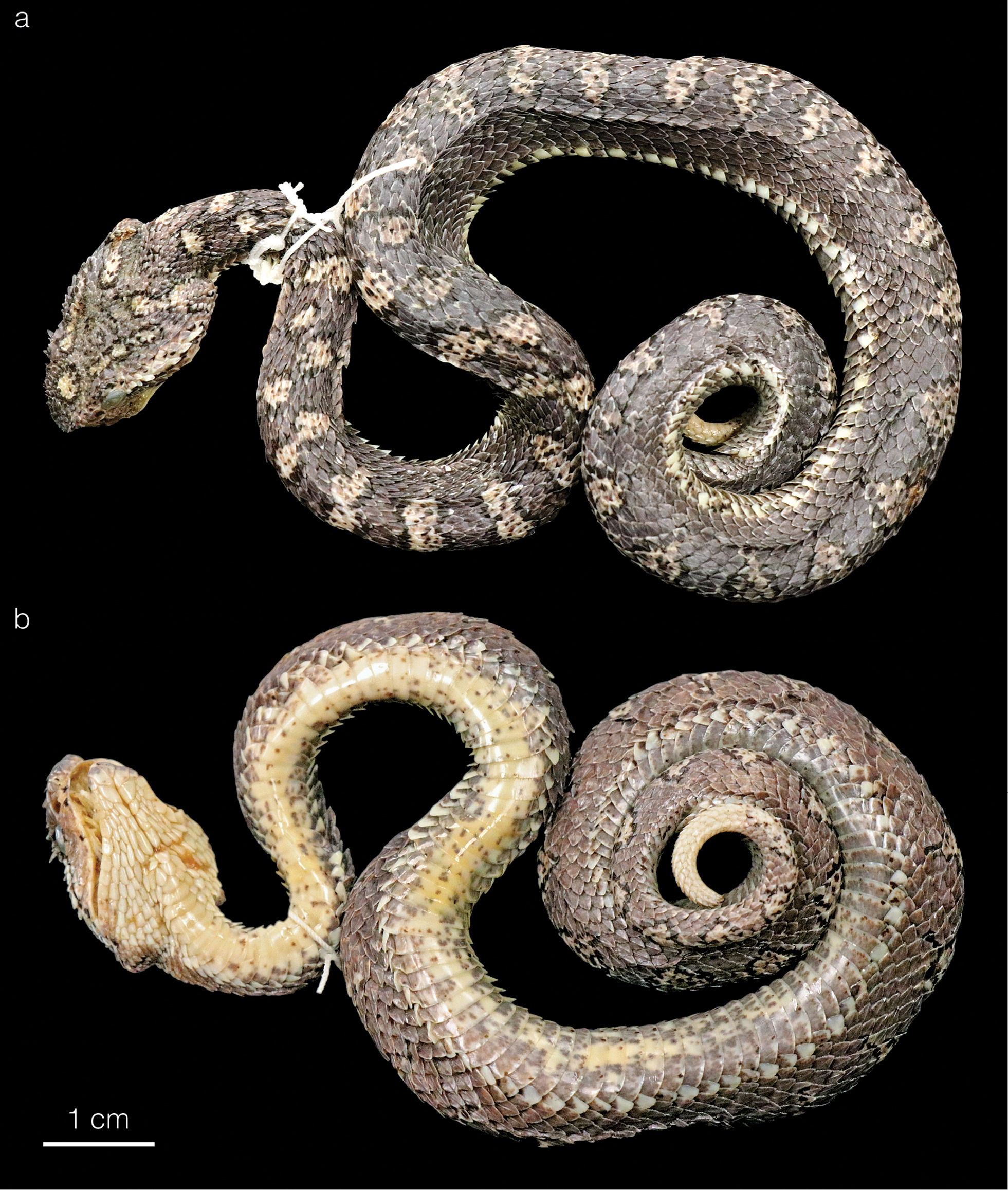
Holotype specimen (adult female)

Bothriechis supraciliaris is usually 50–60 cm (20–24 in) in total length (including tail), but can reach 80 cm (31 in).

Its body colour varies. It can be either bluish-green, reddish-brown, or reddish-maroon, but usually it is bright-green or moss-green. The body is circular, ovoid and rhomboid in cross-section, with irregular dorsal blotches, that sometimes form crossbands. The belly is light. There are 21–23 dorsal scales rows at midbody. The head carries dark stripes and prominent scales that are located above the eyes.

The only sexual dimorphism noted is that females of the species tend to be longer and thicker than males.

== Geographic range ==
The geographic range of B. supraciliaris is limited to southern Costa Rica (between San Isidro and San Vito) and western Panama. All of its range overlaps with that of the closely related species B. nigroadspersus.

== Taxonomy ==
Bothriechis supraciliaris was formerly considered a subspecies of B. schlegelii, the eyelash palm-pitviper. No subspecies are recognized.

== Biology ==
B. supraciliaris is an arboreal species inhabiting evergreen lower-montane forests, cloud forests, clearings with coffee and banana plantations, edges of farm fields, and rural gardens. The species is crepuscular or nocturnal, and are more terrestrial than other Bothriechis species. During the day, individuals may rest on the ground or at the base of trees and shrubs.

The species preys on frogs (including Fitzinger's robber frog), and small forest-floor rodents.

== Venom ==
This species' venom has a potent hemorrhagic action and moderate myotoxicity (muscle death), and some very weak procoagulant activity. Its LD50 is estimated to be 6.04 mg/kg. Equine polyvalent (Viperidae) antivenom from Instituto Clodomiro Picado has been reported to neutralize the lethality of B. supraciliaris venom. This antivenom was produced from the blood plasma of horses immunized with a mixture of venoms from Bothrops asper, Crotalus simus, and Lachesis stenophry.
