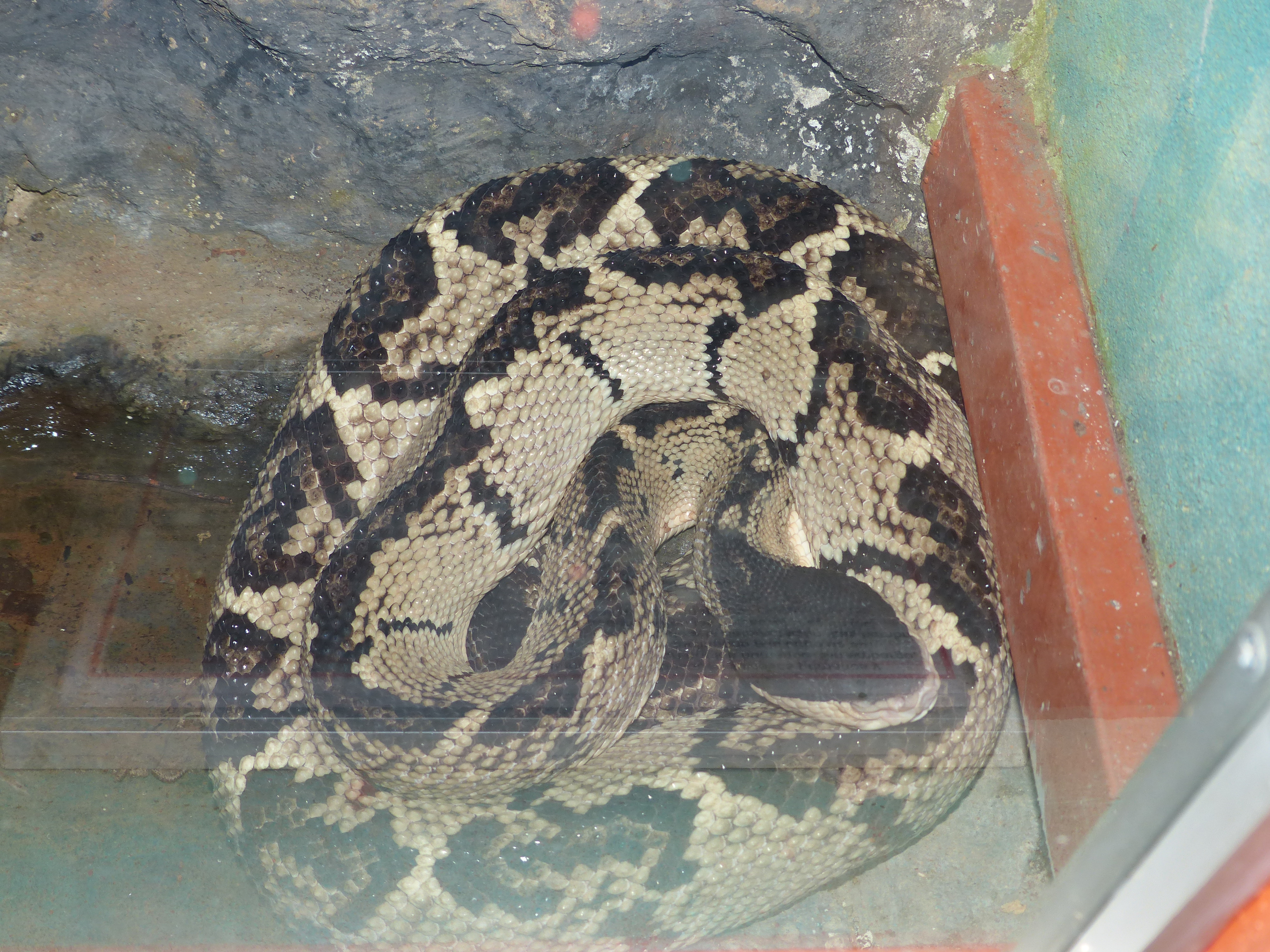

Conservation status
- Vulnerable (IUCN 3.1)

Scientific classification
- Kingdom: Animalia
- Phylum: Chordata
- Class: Reptilia
- Order: Squamata
- Suborder: Serpentes
- Family: Viperidae
- Genus: Lachesis
- Species: L. melanocephala

Binomial name
- Lachesis melanocephala Solórzano & Cerdas, 1986

Synonyms
- Lachesis muta melanocephala Solórzano & Cerdas, 1986; Lachesis melanocephala — Zamudio & Greene, 1997

= Lachesis melanocephala =

Species of snake

Lachesis melanocephala is a species of pit viper in the family Viperidae. The species is native to Costa Rica and Panama. There are no subspecies that are recognized as being valid.

== Common names ==
Common names for L. melanocephala include black-headed bushmaster, as well as cascabel muda ("silent rattlesnake") and matabuey in Spanish.

== Description ==
Adults of L. melanocephala frequently grow to 1.9–2 m (6.2–6.6 ft) in total length (including tail). The largest reported specimens were 2.3 m (7.5 ft) by Solórzano (2004), and 2.4 m (7.9 ft) by Ripa (2001).

The top of the head is uniform black in color, to which the specific name, melanocephala, and common name refer.

== Geographic range ==
L. melanocephala is found in Costa Rica on the Pacific versant of southeastern Puntarenas province from near sea level to about 1500 m (about 4,900 feet). It is also found in Finca Hartmann in Panama's Chiriqui Province. The type locality given is "tropical rainforest 9 km northern of Ciudad Neily in southeastern Provincia de Puntarenas, Costa Rica."

Campbell and Lamar (2004) describe its range as southwestern Costa Rica and possibly extreme western Panama, but state that almost all locality records are from Puntarenas province. Savage (2002) and Dwyer & Perez (2009) confirmed its existence in Panama.

== Diet ==
L. melanocephala preys predominately upon small rodents, especially spiny rats.

== Reproduction ==
L. melanocephala is oviparous. In captivity, females typically lay clutches of 5-19 eggs in a burrow where the eggs will incubate for 60-80 days. Dean Ripa, who survived four envenomations from bushmaster snakes, was the first person to breed the black-headed bushmaster (L. melanocephala) in captivity, of which were supplied to zoos and research institutions internationally.
