= Rock horned lizard =

Conservation status
- Data Deficient (IUCN 3.1)

Scientific classification
- Kingdom: Animalia
- Phylum: Chordata
- Class: Reptilia
- Order: Squamata
- Suborder: Iguania
- Family: Phrynosomatidae
- Genus: Phrynosoma
- Species: P. ditmarsi

Binomial name
- Phrynosoma ditmarsi Stejneger, 1906

Species of reptile

The rock horned lizard (Phrynosoma ditmarsi), also known commonly as Ditmars' horned lizard and camaleón de roca in Mexican Spanish, is a species of lizard in the family Phrynosomatidae. The species is endemic to the Mexican state of Sonora, in northern Mexico, south of the Arizona border. Bearing the shortest horns of all the horned lizards, it lives in thorn-scrub and deciduous Sinaloan woodlands. The rock horned lizard was "lost" to science for about 65 years. It has a unique habitat preference and limited distribution. It also had a very imprecise holotype locality record which made it difficult to locate. An extraordinary effort by Vincent Roth based on a cross-correlational analysis of gut contents from only three specimens led to its rediscovery.

== Etymology ==
Its specific name, ditmarsi, is in honor of Raymond Lee Ditmars, the first curator of reptiles of the Bronx Zoo, and a pioneer in herpetology.

== Habitat ==
The preferred natural habitat of P. ditmarsi is rocky areas in forest and shrubland.

== Description ==
The rock horned lizard has its occipital and temporal horns reduced to flaring expansions. It has a deep and narrow occipital notch and a high postorbital ridge. The mandibles of P. ditmarsi feature a large vertical expansion. It has a bare tympanum in the anterior neck fold posterior to a vertical row of four spines. It has a single row of lateral abdominal fringe scales, which are bluntly pyramidal.

== Reproduction ==
P. ditmarsi is oviparous.
