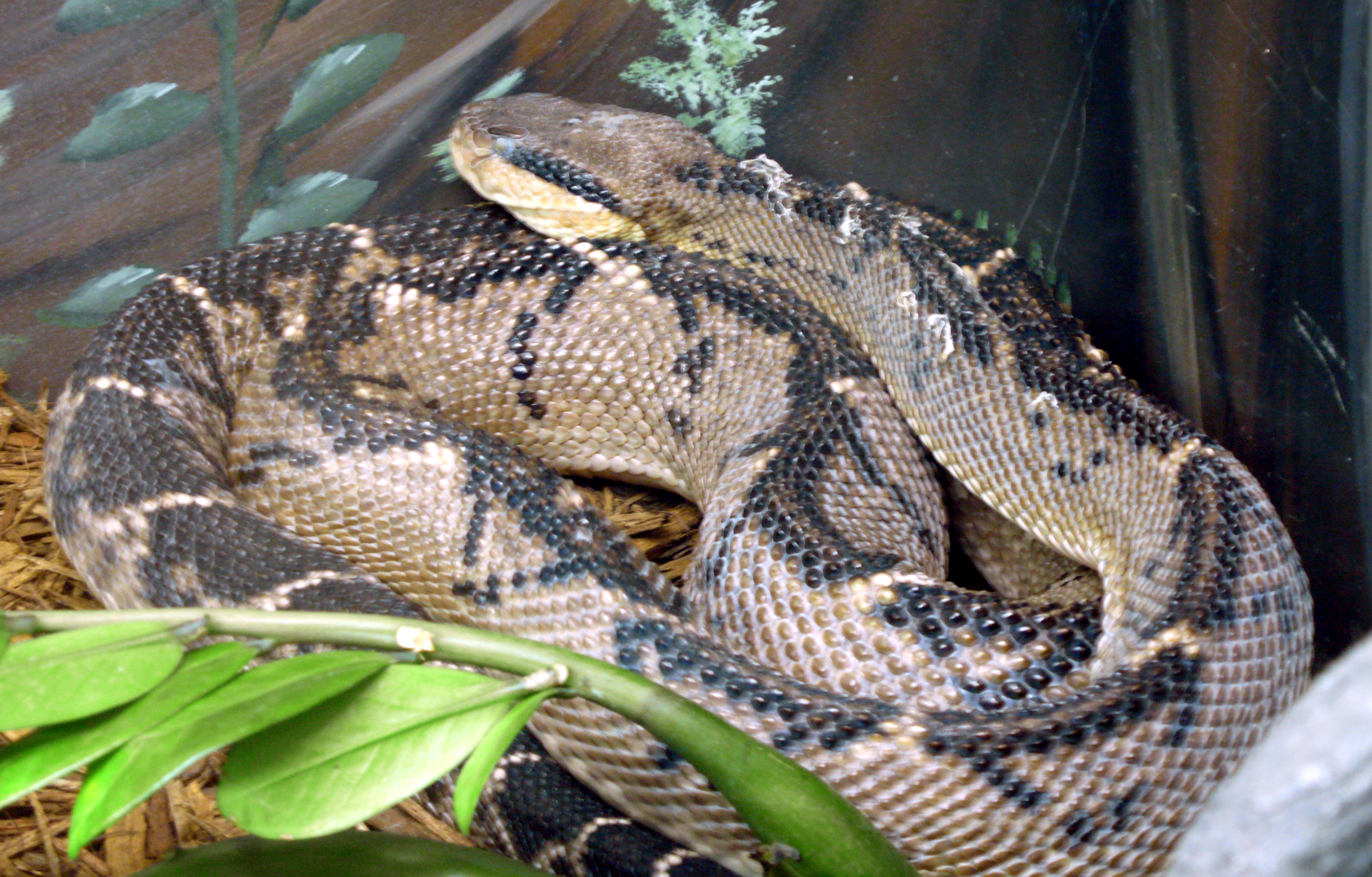

Conservation status
- Near Threatened (IUCN 3.1)

Scientific classification
- Kingdom: Animalia
- Phylum: Chordata
- Class: Reptilia
- Order: Squamata
- Suborder: Serpentes
- Family: Viperidae
- Genus: Lachesis
- Species: L. stenophrys

Binomial name
- Lachesis stenophrys Cope, 1876

Synonyms
- Lachesis stenophrys Cope, 1876; Lachesis muta stenophrys — Taylor, 1951; Lachesis stenophrys — Zamudio & Greene, 1997

= Lachesis stenophrys =

Species of snake

Lachesis stenophrys, commonly called the Central American bushmaster, is a species of pit viper in the family Viperidae. The species is native to Central America.

== Etymology and taxonomy ==
The specific name, stenophrys, is derived from the Greek words stenos, meaning "narrow", and ophrys, meaning "brow" or "eyebrow". There are no subspecies that are recognized as being valid. Campbell and Lamar (2004) also recognized Lachesis acrochorda (García, 1896) as a valid species, which McDiarmid et al. (1999) had treated as a synonym of L. stenophrys. The Reptile Database follows the position of Campbell and Lamar.

== Description ==
Adults of L. stenophrys commonly grow to more than 200 cm (6 feet 6¾ inches) and may exceed 330 cm (10 feet 10 inches) in total length (including tail). Ditmars (1910) reported a specimen from Costa Rica that was 11 feet 4 inches (349 cm). Many accounts exist of much larger specimens, but these are poorly documented. Solórzano (2004) cites historical records that put the maximum length at 360 cm (11 feet 9¾ inches).

It has a broadly rounded head and a snout that is not elevated. Typically, the species has a pronounced middorsal ridge that is most distinct on the last quarter of the body.

The color pattern is darker than that of L. muta.

== Geographic range ==
L. stenophrys is found in Central America in the Atlantic lowlands of southern Nicaragua, Costa Rica and Panama, as well as the Pacific lowlands of central and eastern Panama. The type locality given is "Sipurio" (Limón Province, Costa Rica).

== Habitat ==
L. stenophrys occurs in tropical rainforest and lower montane wet forest where annual precipitation averages 2,000-4,000 mm (79–157 inches), which is heavy to extremely heavy rainfall. In the drier areas of Nicaragua, it can be found in gallery forests as well as forests that are seasonally dry, but then never far from sources of water. This species is hardly ever encountered outside of old growth forest. It is found at altitudes from sea level to 1,100 m (3,600 ft).

== Behavior ==
L. stenophrys is terrestrial and nocturnal.

== Diet ==
L. stenophrys preys predominately upon spiny rats and other small rodents.

== Reproduction ==
L. stenophrys is oviparous.
