= Raymond Ditmars =

American zoologist

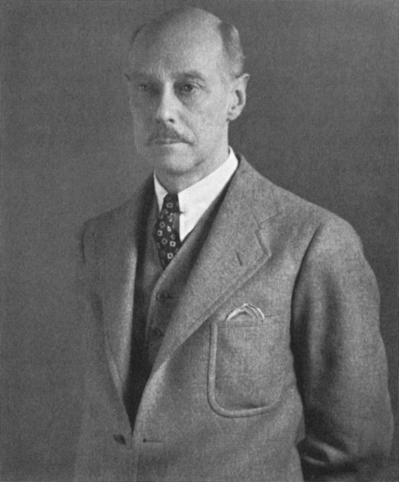
- Ditmars
- Born: Raymond L. Ditmars; June 22, 1876; Newark, New Jersey, U.S.
- Died: May 12, 1942 (aged 65); New York, New York, U.S.
- Occupation: Zoologist

The marriage of Raymond and Clara Ditmars in the New York World, February 6, 1903.

Silent movie Biography of a Stag (1918) by Raymond Ditmars. Running time: 9:28. With intertitles in Dutch. EYE Film Institute Netherlands.

Silent nature documentary The Four Seasons (1921) by Charles Urban and Raymond Lee Ditmars, showing the cyclic changes in living nature through the four seasons with lyrical intertitles. Duration: 01:18:14. Intertitles in Dutch. EYE Film Institute Netherlands.

Silent film showing an African chamaeleon and an Indian cobra. Raymond Ditmars? (1915)

Raymond Lee Ditmars (June 22, 1876 – May 12, 1942) was an American herpetologist, writer, public speaker and pioneering natural history filmmaker.

== Biography ==
Ditmars was fascinated by all animals, but primarily reptiles, obtaining his first snakes at twelve years of age. His parents eventually allowed him to keep all manner of venomous reptiles in the attic of their house at 1666 Bathgate Avenue in the Bronx. Ditmars left school at 16 with no formal qualifications but nevertheless gained a deep understanding of zoology through his own personal study of snakes and other animals in the wild and captivity. Throughout his life, vacations were spent searching for new specimens. Such was his interest and knowledge that he would eventually be regarded as the country's foremost herpetologist.

In 1893, Ditmars was hired as an assistant in the department of entomology at the American Museum of Natural History, primarily because of his talent as an artist. Four years later, he quit this job to take a better-paying job as a stenographer. In July 1898, he began a short stint as a court reporter for the New York Times. One of his first pieces led him to discover the newly created New York Zoological Society (now the Wildlife Conservation Society), which was in the process of building what would become the Bronx Zoo. On July 17, 1899 - four months before the zoo's grand opening - Ditmars was employed as an assistant curator in charge of reptiles. He was then aged twenty-three, and would spend the rest of his career with the zoo. His own collection of forty-five reptiles, representing fifteen species, formed the nucleus of the reptile house, which proved an immediate success with visitors. A few years later he began work on his first major publication, The Reptile Book, while teaching himself still and motion photography. He would provide almost all the illustrations in this and his many subsequent books, and, in 1914, produced and released The Living Book of Nature, his first motion picture to wide acclaim. Many other films followed, pioneering the latest available techniques, including stop-motion animation, timelapse, macro photography, and by the mid-1920s, sound film.

During the late 1920s, Ditmars helped bring about antivenom centers in the United States and Honduras, and soon after launched a series of expeditions to Central and South America in search of tropical specimens for the zoo. His main quarry was a bushmaster, the world's largest type of viper, a specimen of which he successfully brought back from the island of Trinidad in 1934. The previous year, he also famously collected and exhibited the first living specimens of vampire bat.

Ditmars demonstrated an aptitude for animal husbandry (once again self-taught), and was unofficially given responsibility for mammals as well as reptiles soon after his appointment to the Bronx Zoo, but he was not formally granted the title of curator of mammals until 1926, following the retirement of William Hornaday, the zoo's founding director. In 1940 - two years before his death - Ditmars also took charge of insects after a successful exhibit in the 1939–40 World's Fair. Ditmars's flair for self-publicity and the fruitful relationships he maintained with New York reporters ensured that he and the zoo were rarely out of the papers. It was in large part, thanks to the efforts and enthusiasm of Ditmars, that the Bronx Zoo first achieved a world-class status. He also placed $10,000 in trust at a New York bank for the first person to provide evidence of a hoop snake.

== Books ==
Ditmars published several books on zoology, his own life, and his travels. The Reptile Book, discussed above, was released in 1907 to great success; it was republished and expanded several times. With Reptiles of the World in 1910 (edited and expanded in 1933), Snakes of the World in 1931, Reptiles of North America in 1936 and Field Book of North American Snakes in 1939, he helped tap a large public interest in reptiles. Many herpetologists of the baby boomer generation fell in love with reptiles in part through reading Ditmars's titles which, during the post-WW2 years, were often the only books on the topic available in school and town libraries.

His other, more autobiographical, books were also a success and included: Strange Animals I Have Known (1931), Thrills of a Naturalist's Quest (1932), Confessions of a Scientist (1934), Snakehunters' Holiday (1935 - co-authored with William Bridges, then of the New York Sun) and The Making of a Scientist (1937).

== Legacy ==
Ditmars is commemorated in the scientific name of a species of lizard, Phrynosoma ditmarsi.

== Films ==
Ditmars pioneered the direction and production of at least 84 silent nature documentaries, e.g.,

- Life in Our Ponds (1912, Pathé Frères)
- Hidden Life in Sea Weed (1913, Pathé Frères)
- The Snowy Egret and Its Extermination (1913, Pathé Frères)
- The Fish with a Storage Battery in Its Brain (1913)
- The Deadliest of Nature's Celebrities (1914, Pathé Frères)
- Housekeeping at the Zoo (1910 - 1922, a documentary of the New York Zoological Park)
- Insects That Mimic (1914, Pathé Frères (France))
- Amphibian Oddities (1916, Power Picture Plays)
- The Smaller Monkeys (1917)
- Evolution (1918, Educational Films Corporation of America)
- Biography of a Stag (1918, Educational Films, USA, a documentary from a zoo about the growth of the antlers of a stag)
- The Polar Bear (1919)
- The Four Seasons (1921, with Charles Urban?, Kineto Film Company of America, a lyrical documentary of seasonal changes in the natural world))
- Like a Beaver (?)

== Sources ==
- Adler, Kraig (1989). Contributions to the History of Herpetology. Society for the Study of Amphibians and Reptiles (SSAR).
