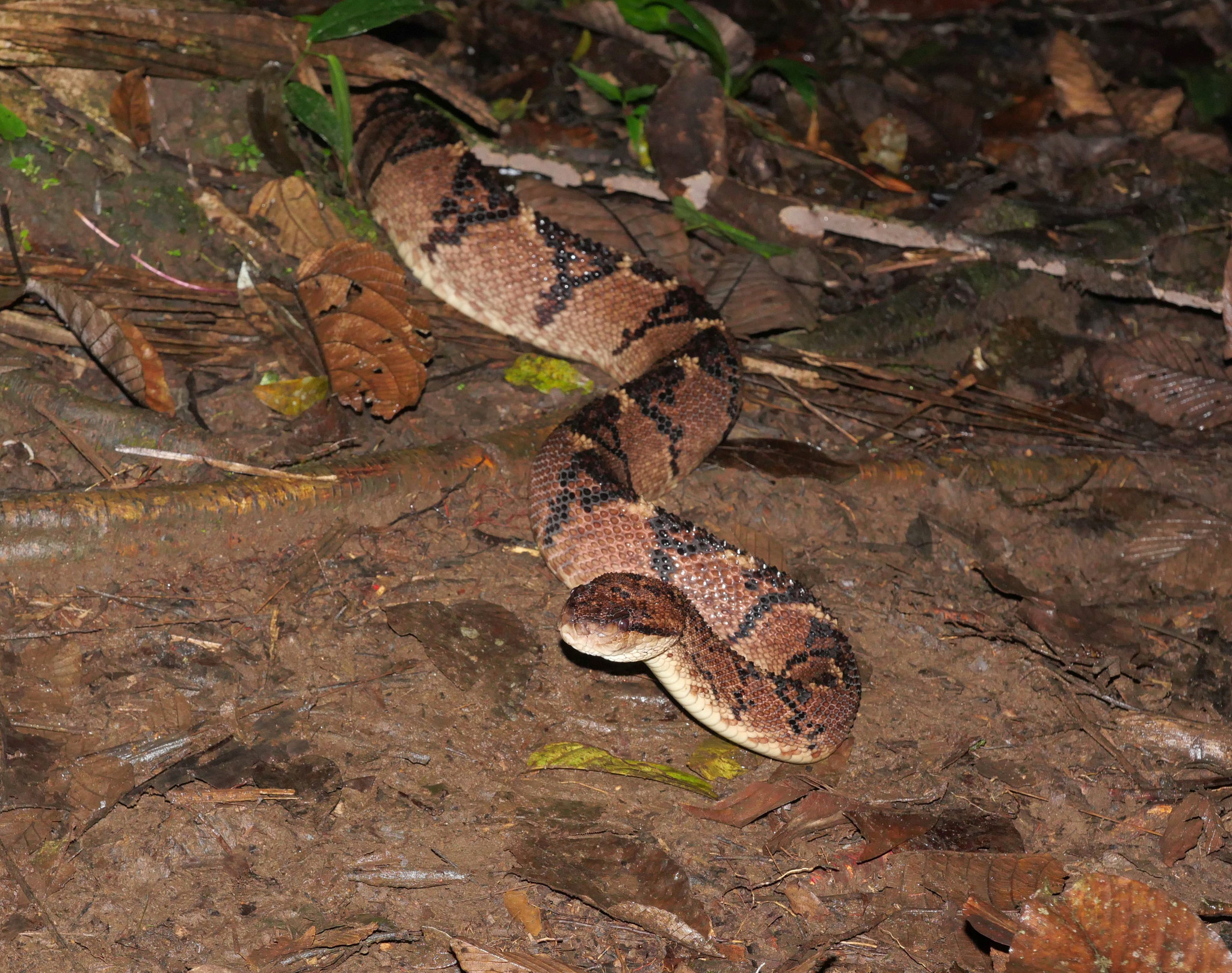

Conservation status
- Least Concern (IUCN 3.1)

Scientific classification
- Kingdom: Animalia
- Phylum: Chordata
- Class: Reptilia
- Order: Squamata
- Suborder: Serpentes
- Family: Viperidae
- Genus: Lachesis
- Species: L. acrochorda

Binomial name
- Lachesis acrochorda (García, 1896)

Synonyms
- Bothrops acrochordus García, 1896; Lachesis acrochorda — Campbell & Lamar, 2004

= Lachesis acrochorda =

Species of snake

Lachesis acrochorda, also known commonly as the Chocoan bushmaster, is a species of pit viper in the family Viperidae. The species is native to Central America and South America.

== Taxonomy ==
L. acrochorda was formerly considered a synonym of Lachesis stenophrys.

== Description ==
L. acrochorda has a light brown head and black postocular stripes that can range from 1–2 scales wide. The longest recorded length of a male individual was 2.327 m (7.63 ft); for females it was 2.342 m (7.68 ft).

== Geographic range ==
L. acrochorda is found in Panama, northern and western Colombia (in the Departments of Chocó, Cauca and Antioquia), and northwestern Ecuador.

== Habitat ==
The preferred natural habitat of L. acrochorda is lowland forest, premontane wet forest, and montane wet forest, mostly in mature forests, at altitudes from sea level to 1,600 m (5,200 ft).

== Behavior ==
L. acrochorda is terrestrial and nocturnal.

== Reproduction ==
L. acrochorda is oviparous.

== Venom ==
The venom of L. acrochorda is extremely dangerous in that a snakebite incident will result in a 90% chance of death. Its venom can cause serious side effects, such as vasodilation and blood anti-coagulation.
