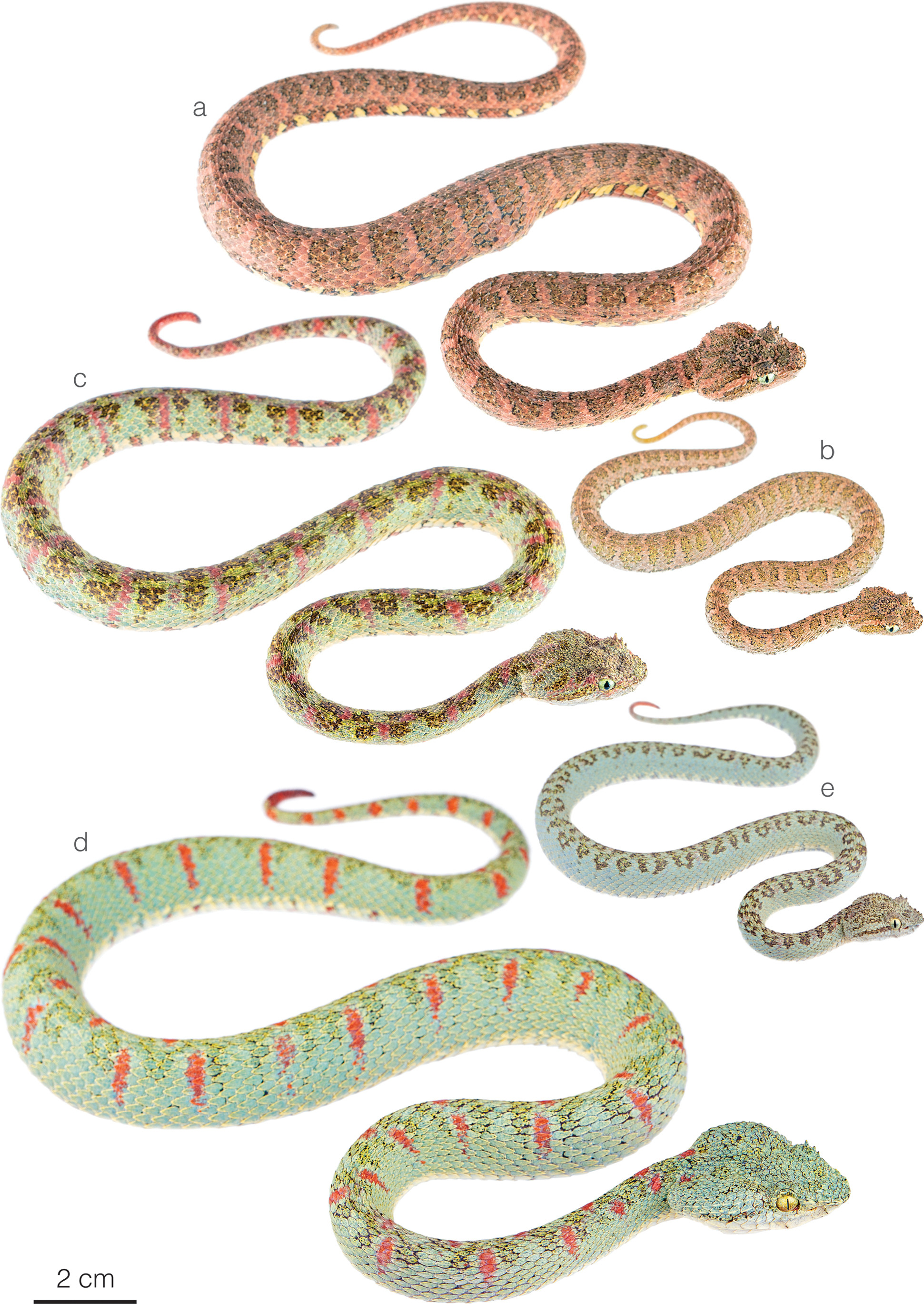
- Specimens from Colombia

Scientific classification
- Kingdom: Animalia
- Phylum: Chordata
- Class: Reptilia
- Order: Squamata
- Suborder: Serpentes
- Family: Viperidae
- Genus: Bothriechis
- Species: B. torvus

Binomial name
- Bothriechis torvus (Posada Arango, 1889)

Synonyms
- Thanatophis torvus Posada Arango, 1889; Teleuraspis birri Posada Arango, 1909

= Bothriechis torvus =

Species of pit viper

Bothriechis torvus is a species of pit viper. Although once listed as a synonym of Bothriechis schlegelii, it was revalidated in a 2024 revision of the latter species. It is known from southeastern Panama and from Antioquia, Colombia.

Bothriechis torvus is an arboreal snake that can grow to a total length of 378 mm (14.9 in) in males and 657 mm (25.9 in) in females.
