= Dean Ripa =

American herpetologist

Dean Ripa (1957–2017) was an American herpetologist, author of The Bushmaster, venomous snake expert, and private zoo operator best known for his work with rare and dangerous species of snakes. He was the founder and director of the Cape Fear Serpentarium, a reptile zoo located in Wilmington, North Carolina. Ripa gained attention for his close handling of venomous reptiles and for curating one of the most diverse collections of venomous snakes in the United States. From 2001 to 2006, he had also sung in the Tommy Dorsey Orchestra.

He died in 2017 when he was fatally shot by his wife, who was later ruled to be not guilty of murder by reason of insanity. The Cape Fear Serpentarium closed in May 2018, a year after his death. The Serpentarium has been inherited by Ripa's four-year-old son, who could not legally handle the venomous snakes. The building and snakes were sold, and the money put in a trust for Ripa's son.
