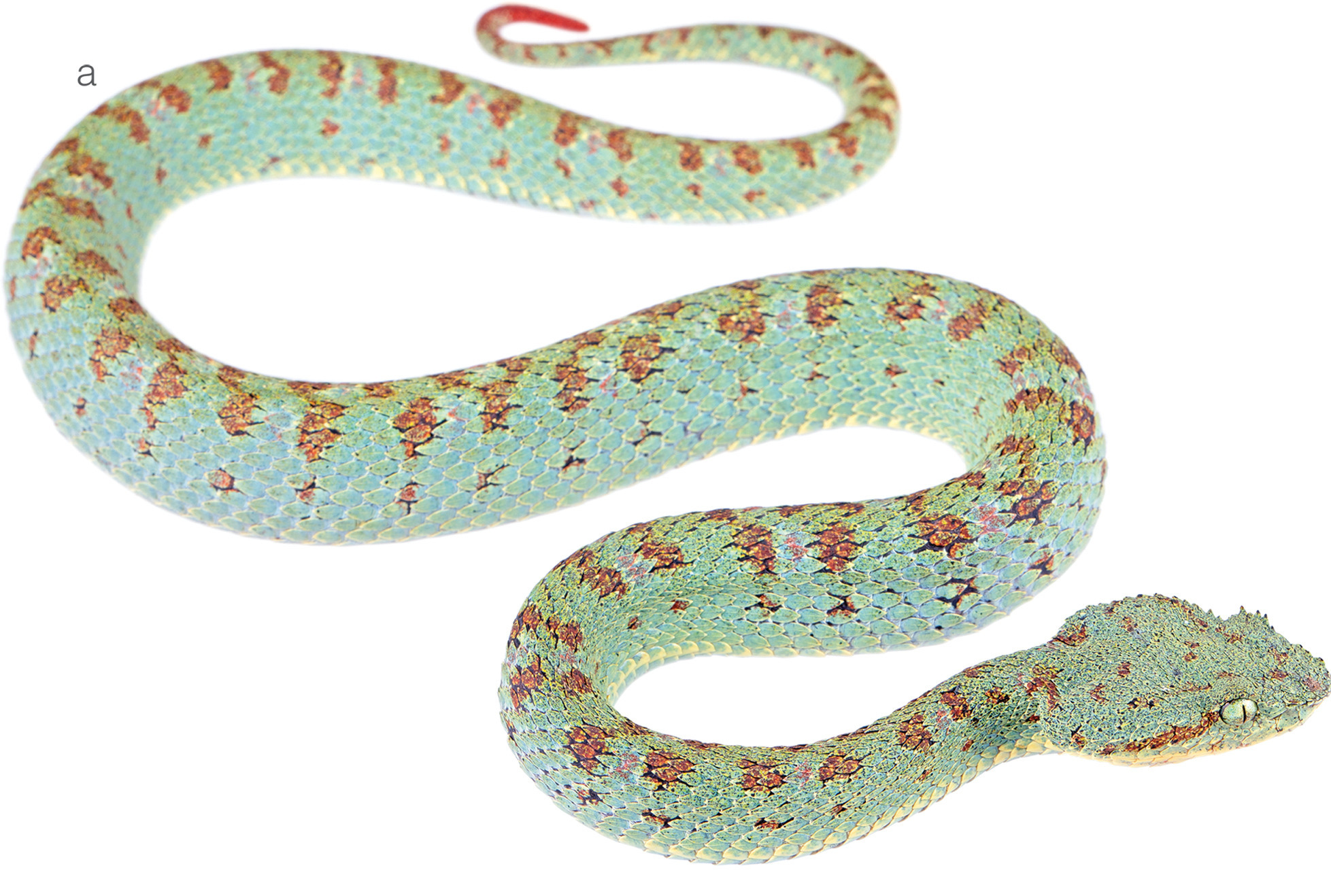
- Female from Colombia

Scientific classification
- Kingdom: Animalia
- Phylum: Chordata
- Class: Reptilia
- Order: Squamata
- Suborder: Serpentes
- Family: Viperidae
- Genus: Bothriechis
- Species: B. khwargi

Binomial name
- Bothriechis khwargi Arteaga et al. 2024

= Bothriechis khwargi =

Species of snake

Bothriechis khwargi, also known as Khwarg’s eyelash-pitviper, is a species of pit viper in the family Viperidae. It was described in 2024, alongside 4 other species in its genus, by the Ecuadorian-Venezuelan herpetologist Alejandro Arteaga and his colleagues. It is named after Juewon Khwarg to honor his work discovering and protecting new species of vipers in the Colombian Andes. Female Khwarg’s eyelash-pitvipers can reach lengths of 610 mm (24 in), while males are shorter, reaching a maximum length of 219 mm (8.6 in).

Khwarg’s eyelash-pitviper is known from the western foothills of Colombia’s Cordillera Oriental. The species occurs over an area of approximately 14,697 km^{2} and has been recorded at elevations of 167–1,800 m (548–5,906 ft) above sea level. It is an arboreal snake that inhabits evergreen foothill forests, where it can be observed on the ground and in low understory vegetation. The study describing Khwarg’s eyelash-pitviper recommended it be classified as being vulnerable on the IUCN Red List because of the species' restricted range, fragmented distribution, and ongoing habitat degradation in its range. Although the species occurs in Yariguíes National Park and a private protected area, most localities where the species has been recorded are in heavily human-modified areas. An estimated 79% of the species' potential range has been deforested for agriculture.

== Taxonomy ==
Bothriechis khwargi was formally described by the Ecuadorian-Venezuelan herpetologist Alejandro Arteaga and his colleagues in 2024 based on an adult female specimen collected from the Betulia municipality in Santander, Colombia, in November 2017. This species is named after Juewon Khwarg to honor his work discovering and protecting new species of vipers in the Colombian Andes. In English, the species is known as Khwarg’s eyelash-pitviper. The Spanish common name for the species is Víbora de pestañas de Khwarg.

== Description ==
Female Khwarg’s eyelash-pitvipers can reach lengths of 610 mm (24 in), while males are shorter, reaching a maximum length of 219 mm (8.6 in). Khwarg’s eyelash-pitvipers have two triangular and moderately raised supraciliary scales, keeled anterior dorsal head scales, and gular scales that are much smaller than their chin shields. There are 7–14 interoculolabial scales, 3–4 canthal scales, some of which have raised triangular projections, and the loreal scale touches the preocular scale in approximately one-third of specimens. There are 21–23 dorsal scale rows at mid-body, and 144–153 rows of ventral scales in males and 145–154 rows in females. There is no yellow morph of the species. The dorsal bands are absent, faint, or restricted to top of the dorsum in juveniles, and opposing kidney-shaped dorsal marks are entirely absent in the species. There are no black speckles on the dorsal scales or ventral surfaces, with the ventral surfaces being entirely white in most individuals. The iris is pale green or straw yellow.

Khwarg’s eyelash-pitviper differs from all other species in its genus by having two triangular and moderately raised supraciliary scales, keeled anterior head scales, gular scales that are much smaller than the chin shields, an entirely pale white belly in most individuals, and faint or absent dorsal bands.

Khwarg’s eyelash-pitviper resembles B. torvus in appearance, but that species does not occur alongside Khwarg’s eyelash-pitviper and is characterized by having thin pink bands on the dorsum. B. klebbai shares part of Khwarg’s eyelash-pitviper's range along the upper slopes of the Serranía De Los Yariguíes. Khwarg’s eyelash-pitviper can be told apart from this species by its smaller size, entirely white belly, pale greenish iris, keeled anterior dorsal head scales, gulars much smaller than chin shields, and lack of black speckling on the dorsal and ventral surfaces.

Holotype specimen (female from Colombia)

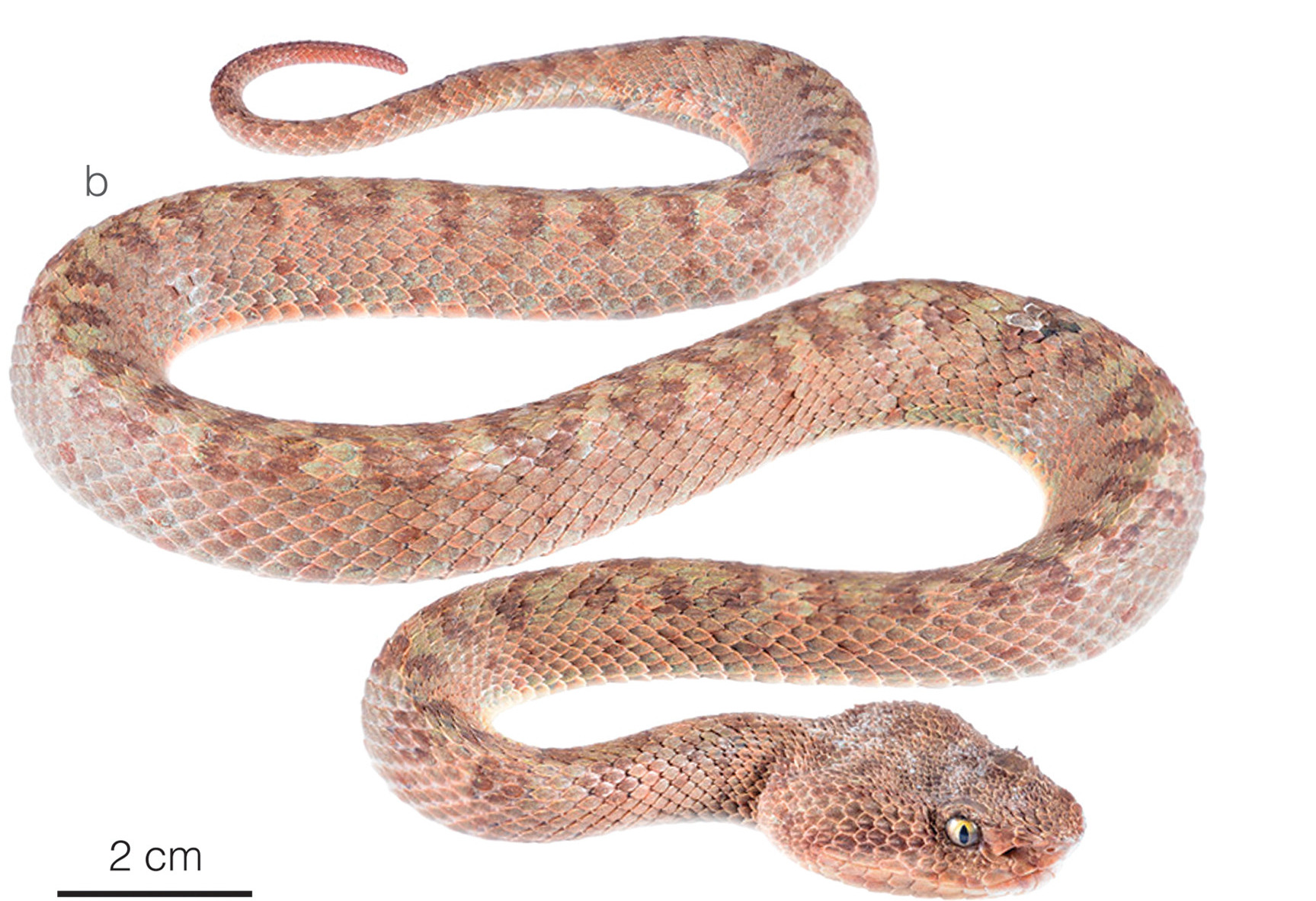
In life

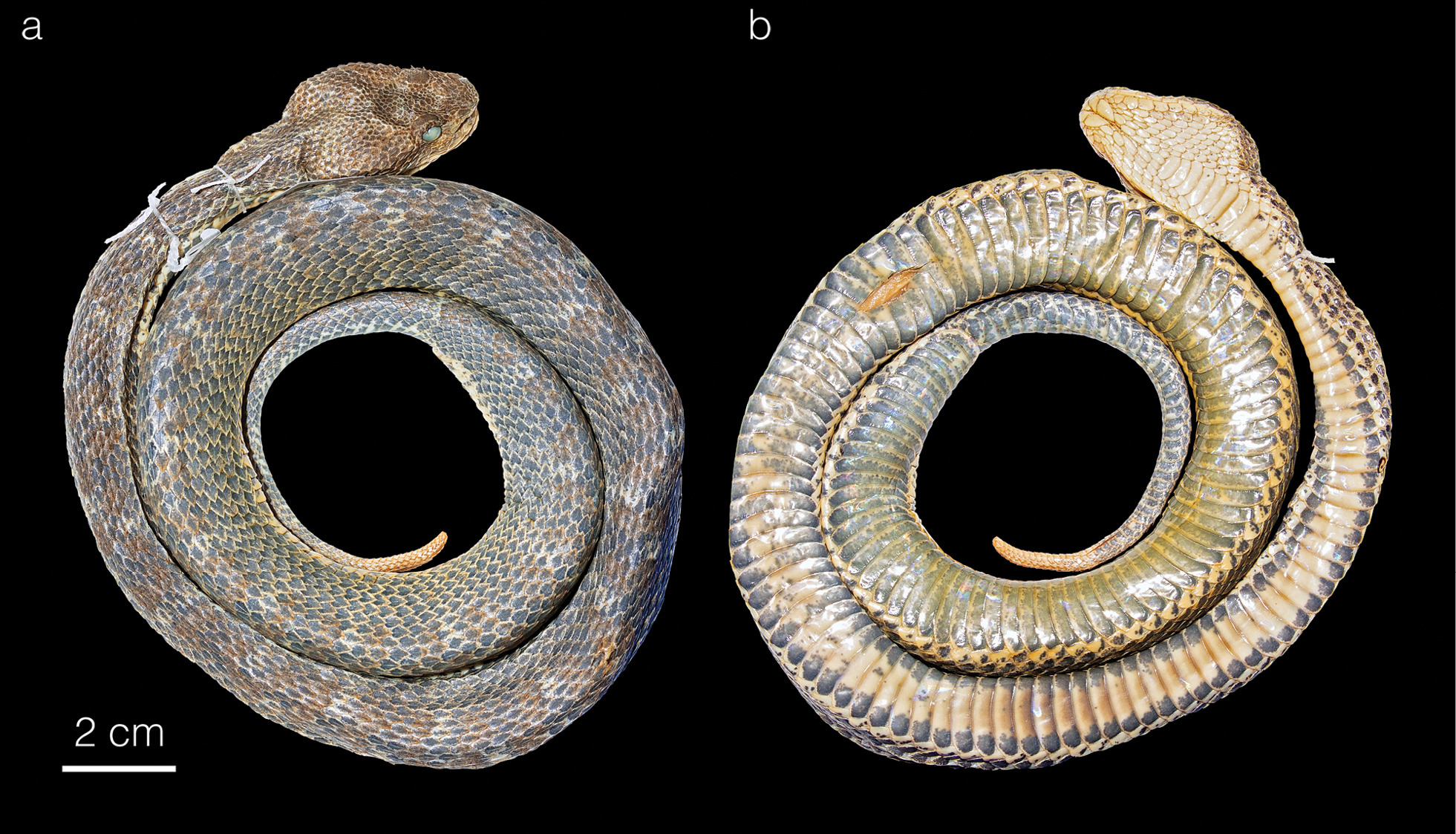
Preserved

== Distribution and habitat ==
Khwarg’s eyelash-pitviper is known from the western foothills of Colombia’s Cordillera Oriental. The species occurs over an area of approximately 14,697 km^{2} and has been recorded at elevations of 167–1,800 m (548–5,906 ft) above sea level. It is an arboreal snake that inhabits evergreen foothill forests. They can be seen both during the night and the day at ground level or on low understory vegetation. One individual was observed at night foraging in a fern one meter above the ground.

== Conservation ==
The study describing Khwarg’s eyelash-pitviper recommended it be classified as being vulnerable on the IUCN Red List because of the species' restricted range, fragmented distribution, and ongoing habitat degradation in its range. Although the species occurs in Yariguíes National Park and a privately protected area (Reserva Natural Reinita Cielo Azul), most localities where the species has been recorded are in heavily human-modified areas. The study estimated that 79% of the forest cover in the species' potential range has been destroyed due to deforestation for agriculture. The species is not known to have been responsible for any snakebites in Colombia.
