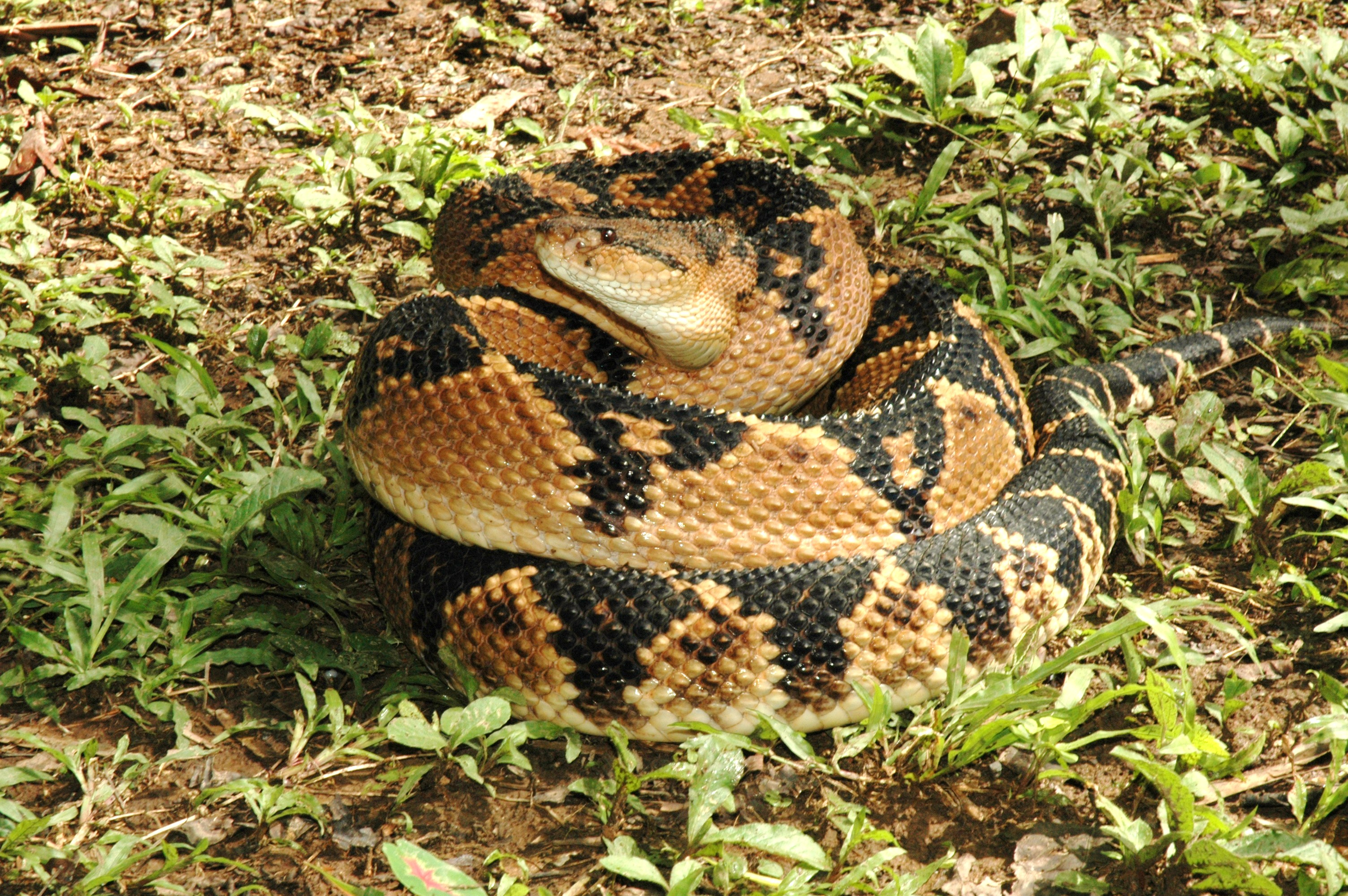
- South American bushmaster, L. muta

Scientific classification
- Kingdom: Animalia
- Phylum: Chordata
- Class: Reptilia
- Order: Squamata
- Suborder: Serpentes
- Family: Viperidae
- Subfamily: Crotalinae
- Genus: Lachesis; Daudin, 1803

Synonyms
- Trigonocephalus Oppel, 1811; Trigalus Rafinesque, 1815; Cophias Merrem, 1820

= Lachesis (genus) =

Genus of snakes

Lachesis (also known commonly as the bushmasters) is a genus of pit vipers in the family Viperidae. Member species are found in forested areas of the Neotropics. The generic name refers to one of the Three Fates, Lachesis (in Greek mythology), who determined the length of the thread of life. Four species are currently recognized as being valid.

== Taxonomy ==
The genus Lachesis was traditionally composed of only three species, but Campbell and Lamar (2004) recognized a fourth species, L. acrochorda (García, 1896), referring to it as the Chochoan bushmaster. Its evolutionary relationships are not certain, but Lachesis acrochorda is thought to be closer to L. muta than to the two Central American species L. stenophrys and L. melanocephala.

=== Species ===
Species	Taxon author	Subsp.*	Common name	Geographic range	Image
L. acrochorda	(García, 1896)	0	Chocoan bushmaster	Panama, Colombia, and Ecuador.	
L. melanocephala	Solórzano & Cerdas, 1986	0	Black-headed bushmaster	Costa Rica: Pacific versant of southeastern Puntarenas province from near sea level to about 1500 m.	
L. muta^{T}	(Linnaeus, 1766)	1	South American bushmaster	South America in the equatorial forests east of the Andes: Colombia, eastern Ecuador, Peru, northern Bolivia, eastern and southern Venezuela, Guyana, Suriname, French Guiana and much of northern Brazil. Also occurs on the island of Trinidad.	
L. stenophrys	Cope, 1875	0	Central American bushmaster	Central America in the Atlantic lowlands of southern Nicaragua, Costa Rica and Panama, as well as the Pacific lowlands of central and eastern Panama. In South America it occurs in the Pacific lowlands of Colombia and northwestern Ecuador, the Caribbean coast of northwestern Colombia and inland along the Magdalena and Cauca River valleys.	

* Not including the nominate subspecies.
^{T} Type species.

== Description ==
Adults of the genus Lachesis typically range in total length (including tail) from 2 to 3 m (6.6 to 9.8 ft), although some may grow to as much as 4 m (13 ft), making Lachesis the longest genus of venomous snake in the Western Hemisphere, and the longest genus of viper in the world. L. muta is possibly the largest of the four species currently recognized, although more scant information suggests that L. stenophrys broadly overlaps in size and may average at a similar size, while L. melanocephala and L. acrochorda are apparently slightly smaller than the prior two species. Although they are not the heaviest vipers, since the Gaboon viper (Bitis gabonica) and the eastern diamondback rattlesnake (Crotalus adamanteus) are heavier, large adults can weigh 3 to 7 kg (6.6 to 15.4 lb). Bushmasters are sexually dimorphic in size, with males reaching larger sizes than females. The bushmasters' tail ends with a horny spine which sometimes vibrates when disturbed like rattlesnakes; due to this, it has been called 'the mute rattlesnake'.

== Geographic range ==
Lachesis species are found in Central and South America, as well as the island of Trinidad in the Caribbean.

== Reproduction ==
Bushmasters lay eggs, about a dozen in an average clutch. The female reportedly remains with her eggs during incubation and may aggressively defend the nest if approached. The hatchlings average 30 cm (12 in) in length and are more colorful than the adults. Lachesis is thought to be unique among New World pit vipers by laying eggs rather than giving birth to live young, although some evidence suggests that the species Bothrocophias colombianus found in Colombia may do the same.

== Venom ==
Bushmasters are capable of multiple-bite strikes and the injection of large amounts of venom. Even the bite of a juvenile specimen can be fatal to a human. However, these snakes are rarely encountered; so snakebite incidents are not common. The venom of Lachesis has several activities, such as the activation of plasminogen, leading to increased permeability of blood vessels, causing edema and lowering of blood pressure. It also has coagulant activity in which thrombin-like enzymes act on fibrinogen, forming small clots that settle in organs such as lungs and kidneys, obstructing capillary blood flow. Hemorrhagic activity is caused by metalloproteases, which damage capillary walls. Both coagulant and hemorrhagic activities act in combination, triggering local and systemic hemorrhagic disorders. Proteolytic activity is due to direct action of proteases (thrombin for example), metalloproteases, and important myotoxic and cytolytic factors. Myotoxic action occurs due to phospholipase generating an inflammatory infiltrate composed of polymorphonuclear leukocytes and macrophages around necrotic cells. Phospholipases can induce necrosis of skeletal muscle fibers. While the defibrinating action results in anticoagulant blood, the venom also has a kininogen-like action; it causes the body to release substances such as bradykinin and kallikrein inducing hypotension. Bradykinin-enhancing peptides interfere with the bradykinin metabolism causing it to last longer in the blood, leading to lasting hypotension. The venom also has a neurotoxic action, isolated from basic phospholipase, that is capable of inducing irreversible blockage of neuromuscular transmission in vitro at concentrations as low as 1 mg/ml.

== Cultural depictions ==
A bushmaster snake is the antagonist in the tenth episode of the radio show Escape. The episode's title was "A Shipment of Mute Fate", and starred Jack Webb and Raymond Lawrence. It was broadcast on 15 October 1947. The story was also adapted for Suspense starring Jack Kelly, broadcast on January 6, 1957.

Jack T. Colton killed a bushmaster in the film Romancing the Stone from 1984 when seeking shelter in a crashed plane.

A bushmaster snake bit a character in the film Primal in 2019.

The Marvel Comics supervillain Bushmaster is named after the genus.

The following weapons and military vehicles are named after this viper:

- Bushmaster XM-15, an AR-15 style rifle manufactured by Bushmaster Firearms International;
- M242 Bushmaster, a chain gun manufactured by Northrop Grumman Innovation Systems;
- Bushmaster IMV, an Australian infantry mobility vehicle;
- A variant of the amphibious Landing Vehicle Tracked introduced in 1944, the LVT-3 Bushmaster.
